This is a comprehensive listing which highlights significant achievements and milestones in Australian music chart history, based upon Kent Music Report and Australian Recording Industry Association.

Songs with the most weeks at number one
24 weeks
 Tones and I – "Dance Monkey" (2019–20)

17 weeks
 The Kid Laroi and Justin Bieber – "Stay" (2021–22)

15 weeks
 Ed Sheeran – "Shape of You" (2017)

14 weeks
 ABBA – "Fernando" (1976)

13 weeks
 The Beatles – "Hey Jude" (1968)
 Coolio – "Gangsta's Paradise" (1995–96)
 Luis Fonsi and Daddy Yankee feat. Justin Bieber – "Despacito" (2017)
 Lil Nas X – "Old Town Road" (2019)

12 weeks
 Dinah Shore – "Buttons and Bows" (1949)
 Eminem – "Lose Yourself" (2002–03)
 Pharrell Williams – "Happy" (2014)

11 weeks
 Wings – "Mull of Kintyre" (1977–78)
 Bryan Adams – "(Everything I Do) I Do It for You" (1991)
 Spice Girls – "Wannabe" (1996–97)
 Drake – "God's Plan" (2018)
 The Weeknd – "Blinding Lights" (2020)
 24kGoldn feat. Iann Dior – "Mood" (2020–21)
 Glass Animals – "Heat Waves" (2021–22)

10 weeks
 The Platters – "Smoke Gets in Your Eyes" (1959)
 Daddy Cool – "Eagle Rock" (1971)
 ABBA – "Mamma Mia" (1975)
 Whitney Houston – "I Will Always Love You" (1992–93)
 Sandi Thom – "I Wish I Was a Punk Rocker (With Flowers in My Hair)" (2006)
 LMFAO feat. Lauren Bennett and GoonRock – "Party Rock Anthem" (2011)
 Elton John feat. Dua Lipa – "Cold Heart (Pnau remix)" (2021–22)

Artists with the most number-one songs
The Beatles (26)
Elvis Presley (14)
Madonna (11)
Kylie Minogue (10)
Rihanna (10)
Taylor Swift (9)
Delta Goodrem (9)
Pink (9)
Justin Bieber (8)
Eminem (8)
The Black Eyed Peas (8)
Britney Spears (6)
ABBA (6)
Ed Sheeran (6)
Guy Sebastian (6)
Roy Orbison (6)
The Rolling Stones (6)
George Michael (5)
Olivia Newton-John (5)
U2 (5)
Elton John (5)

Artists with the most consecutive number-one songs
The Beatles – 14 (1966-1970)
The Beatles – 7 (1964-1965)
Delta Goodrem – 6 (2002-2004)
ABBA – 6 (1975-1976)

Longest climb to #1 on the ARIA Singles Chart
 36 years and 10 months – "Running Up That Hill" – Kate Bush (August 1985-June 2022)
 25 years and 4 months – "Unchained Melody" – The Righteous Brothers (August 1965-November 1990)
 24 years – "All I Want for Christmas Is You" – Mariah Carey (December 1994-December 2018)
 22 weeks – "Without You" – The Kid Laroi (10 May 2021) 
 21 weeks – "Perfect" – Ed Sheeran (17 December 2017)

Longest climb to #1 on the ARIA Top 100 Albums Chart (1983-present)
 138 weeks – Remasters – Led Zeppelin (Debut 18-Nov-90/Peak 11-Jul-93)
 77 weeks – The Very Best – INXS (peak 23-Feb-2014)
 69 weeks – Janet Jackson's Rhythm Nation 1814 – Janet Jackson (debut 16-Oct-89, peak 3-Feb-91)
 65 weeks – Come On Over – Shania Twain (debut 23-Nov-97, peak 8-Feb-99)
 59 weeks – Elephunk – The Black Eyed Peas (debut 14-July-03, peak 23-Aug-04)
 52 weeks – Don't Ask – Tina Arena (debut 27-Nov-94, peak 19-Nov-95)
 48 weeks – In the Lonely Hour – Sam Smith (debut 8-June-2014, peak 3-May-15)
 46 weeks – Whitney Houston – Whitney Houston (debut 17-June-1985, peak 2-June-86)
 46 weeks – + – Ed Sheeran (debut 3-Oct-11, peak 13-Aug-12)
 45 weeks – Crowded House – Crowded House (debut 28-July-86, peak 8-June-87)
 45 weeks – The Dutchess – Fergie (debut 25-Sep-06, peak 30-July-07)
 43 weeks – Escape – Enrique Iglesias (debut 12-Nov-01, peak 26-Aug-02)
 41 weeks – The Dream of the Blue Turtles – Sting (debut 8-July-1985, peak 21-Apr-86)
 41 weeks – The Marshall Mathers LP – Eminem (debut 29-May-00, peak 5-Mar-01)
 40 weeks – Hysteria – Def Leppard (debut 23-Oct-88, peak 31-July-89)

Songs making the biggest drop from number one
1→100+ Mariah Carey – "All I Want For Christmas Is You" (2018, coinciding with the end of the Christmas period)
1→54 Karise Eden – "Stay with Me Baby" (2012, coinciding with the end of The Voice Australia)
1→24 Celine Dion – "My Heart Will Go On" (1998, CD single pulled from the shelves to be replaced by the dance version two weeks later which then peaked at No. 3)
1→15 Jesse McCartney – "Beautiful Soul" (2005)
1→12 Reece Mastin – "Shout it Out" (2012)
1→12 Katy Perry – "Rise" (2016)

Songs making the biggest jump to number one inside Top 100 (1963 to present)
 59→1 Wiz Khalifa feat. Charlie Puth – "See You Again" (2015)
 41→1 Elton John – "Something About the Way You Look Tonight" / "Candle in the Wind 1997" (1997)
 37→1 Sinéad O'Connor – "Nothing Compares 2 U" (1990)
 36→1 The Beatles – "Yellow Submarine / Eleanor Rigby" (1966)
 31→1 Kylie Minogue – "Confide in Me" (1994)
 31→1 Rihanna – "Don't Stop The Music" (2008)
 26→1 Delta Goodrem – "Wings" (2015)
 20→1 Lukas Graham – "7 Years" (2016)
 19→1 Madonna – "Vogue" (1990)
 18→1 Sheppard – "Geronimo" (2014)
 17→1 Nena – "99 Luftballons" / "99 Red Balloons" (1984)
 17→1 Lady Gaga and Bradley Cooper – "Shallow" (2018)
 16→1 The Beatles – "Can't Buy Me Love / You Can't Do That" (1964)
 16→1 Coolio feat. L.V. – "Gangsta's Paradise" (1995→1996)
 13→1 Creedence Clearwater Revival – "Up Around the Bend / Run Through the Jungle" (1970)
 12→1 Kelly Clarkson – "Mr. Know It All" (2011)
 11→1 David Bowie – "Sorrow" (1974)
 11→1 Shaggy – "Boombastic" (1996)
 11→1 Colbie Caillat – "Bubbly" (2008)
 11→1 Richard Marx – "Right Here Waiting" (1989)
 10→1 The Black Eyed Peas – "The Time (Dirty Bit)" (2010)
 10→1 The Kid Laroi – "Without You" (2021)

Most number-one singles from a single album
5 – Delta Goodrem – Innocent Eyes (2003)
"Born to Try"
"Lost Without You"
"Innocent Eyes"
"Not Me, Not I"
"Predictable"
3 – ABBA – ABBA (1975)
"I Do, I Do, I Do, I Do, I Do"
"Mamma Mia"
"SOS"
3 – ABBA – Arrival (1976)
"Fernando"
"Dancing Queen"
"Money, Money, Money"
3 – Kylie Minogue – Kylie (1988)
"Locomotion"
"I Should Be So Lucky"
"Got to Be Certain"
3 – Britney Spears – In the Zone (2003)
"Me Against the Music" (featuring Madonna)
"Toxic"
"Everytime"
3 – The Black Eyed Peas – The E.N.D. (2009)
"Boom Boom Pow"
"I Gotta Feeling"
"Meet Me Halfway"
3 – Macklemore & Ryan Lewis – The Heist (2012/2013)
"Thrift Shop" (featuring Wanz)
"Same Love" (featuring Mary Lambert)
"Can't Hold Us" (featuring Ray Dalton)
3 – Taylor Swift – 1989 (2014/2015)
"Shake It Off"
"Blank Space"
"Bad Blood" (featuring Kendrick Lamar)
3 – Drake – Scorpion (2018)
"God's Plan"
"Nice for What"
"In My Feelings"

Most top five singles from a single album

6 – Ed Sheeran – ÷ (2017)
"Shape of You" (#1)
"Perfect" (#1)
"Castle on the Hill" (#2)
"How Would You Feel (Paean)" (#2)
"Galway Girl" (#2)
"Dive" (#5)
5 – Delta Goodrem – Innocent Eyes (2002-2004)
"Born to Try"(#1)
"Lost Without You"(#1)
"Innocent Eyes"(#1)
"Not Me, Not I"(#1)
"Predictable"(#1)
5 – Pink – I'm Not Dead (2006-2007)
"Who Knew" (#2)
"Stupid Girls" (#4)
"U + Ur Hand" (#5)
"Leave Me Alone (I'm Lonely)" (#5)
"Dear Mr. President" (#5)
5 – Fergie – The Dutchess (2006-2007)
"Big Girls Don't Cry" (#1)
"Glamorous" (#2)
"Clumsy" (#3)
"London Bridge" (#3)
"Fergalicious" (#4)
5 – Katy Perry – Teenage Dream (2010-2011)
"California Gurls" (featuring Snoop Dogg) (#1)
"Teenage Dream" (#2)
"Firework" (#3)
"E.T." (featuring Kanye West) (#5)
"Last Friday Night (T.G.I.F.)" (#5)
5 – Drake – Scorpion (2018)
"God's Plan" (#1)
"Nice for What" (#1)
"In My Feelings" (#1)
"Don't Matter to Me" (#3)
"Nonstop" (#5)
 5 - Taylor Swift - Midnights (2022)
"Anti-Hero (#1)
"Lavender Haze (#2)
"Snow on the Beach (#3)
"Maroon" (#4)
"Midnight Rain" (#5)
4 – ABBA – ABBA (1975-1976)
"I Do, I Do, I Do, I Do, I Do" (#1)
"Mamma Mia" (#1)
"SOS" (#1)
"Rock Me" (#4)
4 – Michael Jackson – Thriller (1982-1984)
"Billie Jean" (#1)
"Beat It" (#2)
"The Girl Is Mine" (#4)
"Thriller" (#4)
4 – Madonna – Like a Virgin (1984-1985)
"Like a Virgin" (#1)
"Angel" (#1)
"Material Girl" (#4)
"Dress You Up" (#5)
4 – Madonna – Like a Prayer (1989-1990)
"Like a Prayer" (#1)
"Keep It Together" (along with Vogue) (#1)
"Cherish" (#4)
"Express Yourself" (#5)
4 – Shania Twain – Come on Over (1998-1999)
"You're Still the One" (#1)
"From This Moment On" (#2)
"That Don't Impress Me Much" (#2)
"Man! I Feel Like a Woman!" (#4)
4 – Kylie Minogue – Fever (2001-2002)
"Can't Get You Out of My Head" (#1)
"In Your Eyes" (#1)
"Love at First Sight" (#3)
"Come Into My World" (#4)
4 – Eminem – The Eminem Show (2002-2003)
"Without Me" (#1)
"Cleanin' Out My Closet" (#3)
"Business" (#4)
"Sing for the Moment" (#5)
4 – Christina Aguilera – Stripped (2002-2003)
"Beautiful" (#1)
"Dirrty" (#4)
"Fighter" (#5)
"Can't Hold Us Down" (#5)
4 – The Black Eyed Peas – Elephunk (2003-2004)
"Where Is the Love?" (#1)
"Shut Up" (#1)
"Let's Get It Started" (#2)
"Hey Mama" (#4)
4 – Nelly – Sweat+Suit (2004)
"Flap Your Wings" (#1)
"My Place" (#1)
"Over and Over" (featuring Tim McGraw) (#1)
"Tilt Ya Head Back" (featuring Christina Aguilera) (#5)
4 – The Pussycat Dolls – PCD (2005-2006)
"Don't Cha" (featuring Busta Rhymes) (#1)
"Stickwitu" (#2)
"Buttons" (featuring Snoop Dogg) (#2)
"Beep" (featuring will.i.am) (#3)
4 – Rihanna – Good Girl Gone Bad (2007-2008)
"Umbrella" (featuring Jay-Z) (#1)
"Don't Stop the Music" (#1)
"Take a Bow" (#3)
"Shut Up and Drive" (#4)
4 – Beyoncé – I Am... Sasha Fierce (2008-2009)
"Sweet Dreams" (#2)
"If I Were A Boy" (#3)
"Halo" (#3)
"Single Ladies" (#5)
 4 – Lady Gaga – The Fame (2008-2009)
"Just Dance" (#1)
"Poker Face" (#1)
"Paparazzi" (#2)
"LoveGame" (#4)
4 – Ke$ha – Animal (2009-2010)
"TiK ToK" (#1)
"Blah Blah Blah (feat. 3OH!3)" (#3)
"Your Love Is My Drug" (#3)
"Take It Off" (#5)
4 – Flo Rida – Wild Ones (2011-2012)
"Wild Ones" (#1)
"Whistle" (#1)
"I Cry" (#3)
"Good Feeling" (#4)
4 – Jason Derulo – Tattoos (2013-2014)
"Talk Dirty" (#1)
"Trumpets" (#1)
"Wiggle" (#3)
"The Other Side" (#4)
4- David Guetta - Listen (2014-2015)
"Lovers on the Sun" (#2)
"Shot Me Down" (#3)
"Bad" (#5)
"Hey Mama" (#5)
4 – Taylor Swift – 1989 (2014-2015)
"Shake It Off" (#1)
"Blank Space" (#1)
"Bad Blood" (#1)
"Wildest Dreams" (#3)
4 – Justin Bieber – Purpose (2015-2016)
"What Do You Mean?" (#1)
"Love Yourself" (#1)
"Sorry" (#2)
"Where Are Ü Now" (#3)
4 – Post Malone – Hollywood's Bleeding (2018-2019)
"Sunflower" (#1)
"Wow." (#2)
"Circles" (#2)
"Goodbyes" (#5)
4 – Olivia Rodrigo – Sour (2021)
"Drivers License" (#1)
"Good 4 U" (#1)
"Deja Vu" (#3)
"Traitor" (#5)
4 – Harry Styles (2022)
"As It Was" (#1) 
"Late Night Talking" (#2) 
"Matilda" (#3)
"Music for a Sushi Restaurant" (#4)

Most top-ten singles in a year
 9 – Taylor Swift (2022)
"Anti-Hero (#1)
"Lavender Haze (#2)
"Snow on the Beach (#3)
"Maroon" (#4)
"Midnight Rain" (#5)
"You're on Your Own, Kid" (#6)
"Bejeweled (#8)
"Karma" (#9)
"Vigilante Shit" (#10)
8 – Harry Styles (2022)
"As It Was" (#1) 
"Late Night Talking" (#2) 
"Matilda" (#3)
"Music for a Sushi Restaurant" (#4)
"Little Freak" (#6)
"Daylight" (#8)
"Grapejuice" (#9)
"Satellite" (#10)
7 – Ed Sheeran (2017)
"Shape of You" (#1)
"Castle on the Hill" (#2)
"How Would You Feel (Paean)" (#2)
"Dive" (#5)
"Perfect" (#1)
"Galway Girl" (#2)
"River" (#2) (Eminem featuring Ed Sheeran)
7 – Billie Eilish (2019)
"Everything I Wanted" (#2)  
"When the Party's Over" (#7) 
"Bury a Friend" (#3)  
"Wish You Were Gay" (#5)
"Bad Guy" (#1)
"Xanny" (#10)  
"All the Good Girls Go to Hell" (#8) 
6 – will.i.am (2010) 
"I Gotta Feeling" (#1) (as part of The Black Eyed Peas)
"Rock That Body" (#8) (as part of The Black Eyed Peas)
"3 Words" (#5) (Cheryl Cole featuring will.i.am)
"Imma Be" (#7) (as part of The Black Eyed Peas)
"OMG" (#1) (Usher featuring will.i.am)
"The Time (Dirty Bit)" (#1) (as part of The Black Eyed Peas)
6 – Flo Rida (2012)
"Good Feeling" (#4)
"Hangover" (#3) (Taio Cruz featuring Flo Rida)
"Wild Ones" (#1) (featuring Sia)
"Whistle" (#1)
"I Cry" (#3) 
"Troublemaker" (#4) (Olly Murs featuring Flo Rida)
6 – Drake (2018)
"God's Plan" (#1)
"Nice for What" (#1)
"In My Feelings" (#1)
"Don't Matter to Me" (#3) (featuring Michael Jackson)
"Nonstop" (#5)
"Sicko Mode" (with Travis Scott) (#7)
6 – Post Malone (2018)
"Rockstar" (#1) (featuring 21 Savage)
"I Fall Apart" (#2) 
"Psycho" (#1) (featuring Ty Dolla Sign)
"Better Now" (#2)
"Paranoid" (#10)
"Sunflower" (#2) (with Swae Lee) 
6 – Taylor Swift (2020)
"Cardigan" (#1)
"Willow" (#1)
"Exile" (#3)
"The 1" (#4)
"The Last Great American Dynasty" (#7) 
"My Tears Ricochet" (#8)
6 – Drake (2021)
"Girls Want Girls" (#2) (featuring Lil Baby)
"Fair Trade" (#3) (featuring Travis Scott)
"Champagne Poetry" (#6)
"What's Next" (#7)
"Way 2 Sexy" (#7) (featuring Future & Young Thug)
"Papi's Home" (#8)
5 – Fergie (2010) 
"I Gotta Feeling" (#1) (as part of The Black Eyed Peas)
"Rock That Body" (#8) (as part of The Black Eyed Peas)
"Imma Be" (#7) (as part of The Black Eyed Peas)
"Gettin' Over You" (#5) (David Guetta and Chris Willis featuring Fergie and LMFAO)
"The Time (Dirty Bit)" (#1) (as part of The Black Eyed Peas)
5 – Katy Perry (2010)
"Starstrukk" (#4) (3OH!3 featuring Katy Perry)
"If We Ever Meet Again" (#9) (Timbaland featuring Katy Perry)
"California Gurls" (#1) (featuring Snoop Dogg)
"Teenage Dream" (#2)
"Firework" (#3)
5 – Ke$ha (2010)
"Tik Tok" (#1)
"Blah Blah Blah" (#3) (featuring 3OH!3)
"Your Love Is My Drug" (#3)
"Take It Off" (#5)
"We R Who We R" (#1)
5 – David Guetta (2011)
"Who's That Chick?" (#7) (featuring Rihanna)
"Sweat" (#1) (with Snoop Dogg)
"Where Them Girls At" (#6) (featuring Flo Rida and Nicki Minaj)
"Titanium" (#5) (featuring Sia)
"Without You" (#6) (featuring Usher)
5 – Rihanna (2011)
"Who's That Chick?" (#7) (David Guetta featuring Rihanna)
"S&M" (#1)
"California King Bed" (#4)
"Cheers (Drink to That)" (#6)
"We Found Love" (#2) (featuring Calvin Harris)
5 – Karise Eden (2012)
"Nothing's Real but Love" (#9)
"Hallelujah" (#2)
"Stay with Me Baby" (#1)
"I Was Your Girl" (#3)
"You Won't Let Me" (#5)
5 – Ed Sheeran (2014)
"I See Fire" (#10)
"Sing" (#1)
"Don't" (#4)
"Thinking Out Loud" (#1)
"Do They Know It's Christmas? (2014)" (#3) (as part of Band Aid 30)
5 – Taylor Swift (2015)
"Shake It Off" (#1)
"Blank Space" (#1)
"Style" (#8)
"Bad Blood" (#1) (featuring Kendrick Lamar)
"Wildest Dreams" (#3)
5 – Justin Bieber (2016)
"What Do You Mean?" (#1)
"Sorry" (#2)
"Love Yourself" (#1)
"Cold Water" (#1) (Major Lazer featuring Justin Bieber and MØ)
"Let Me Love You" (#2) (DJ Snake featuring Justin Bieber)
5 – Khalid (2018)
"Silence" (#5) (Marshmello featuring Khalid)
"Love Lies" (#3) (with Normani)
"Lovely" (#5) (Billie Eilish featuring Khalid)
"Eastside" (#2) (Benny Blanco featuring Halsey and Khalid)
"Better" (#6)
5 – Ariana Grande (2019)
"Thank U, Next" (#1)
"7 Rings" (#1)
"Break Up with Your Girlfriend, I'm Bored" (#2)
"Boyfriend" (with Social House) (#4)
"Don't Call Me Angel" (with Miley Cyrus and Lana Del Rey) (#4)
5 – Billie Eilish (2020)
"Bad Guy" (#1)
"Everything I Wanted" (#2)
"My Future" (#3)
"Therefore I Am" (#3)
"No Time to Die" (#4)
5 – Justin Bieber (2020)
"Intentions" (#2) (featuring Quavo)
"Stuck with U" (#3) (with Ariana Grande)
"Yummy" (#4)
"Holy" (#4) (featuring Chance the Rapper)
"Monster" (#7) (with Shawn Mendes)
5 – Ariana Grande (2020)
"Positions" (#1)
"Rain On Me" (#2) (with Lady Gaga)
"Stuck with U" (#3) (with Justin Bieber)
"Santa Tell Me" (#6) 
"34+35" (#9)
5 – Ed Sheeran (2021)
"Bad Habits" (#1) 
"Shivers" (#2)
"Visiting Hours" (#3) 
"Afterglow" (#7)
"Overpass Graffiti" (#8)
5 – The Weeknd (2021)
"Blinding Lights" (#1) 
"Save Your Tears" (#3) 
"Moth to a Flame" (with Swedish House Mafia) (#4)
"Take My Breath" (#9)
"One Right Now" (with Post Malone) (#9)
4 – Spice Girls (1998)
"Too Much" (#9)
"Stop" (#5)
"Viva Forever" (#2)
"Goodbye" (#3)
4 – Justin Bieber (2017)
"Despacito" (#1) (Luis Fonsi & Daddy Yankee featuring Justin Bieber)  
"I'm the One" (#1) (DJ Khaled featuring Justin Bieber, Quavo, Chance the Rapper, and Lil Wayne)
"2U" (#2) (David Guetta featuring Justin Bieber)  
"Friends" (#2) (with BloodPop)
4 – Taylor Swift (2017)
"Look What You Made Me Do" (#1)
"I Don't Wanna Live Forever" (#3) (with Zayn Malik)
"...Ready for It?" (#3)
"Gorgeous" (#9)
4 – Ariana Grande (2018)
"No Tears Left to Cry" (#1)
"Thank U, Next" (#1)
"God Is a Woman" (#5)
"Breathin" (#8)
4 – Marshmello (2018)
"Happier" (#3) (with Bastille)  
"Friends" (#4) (with Anne-Marie)
"Silence" (#5) (featuring Khalid)  
"Wolves" (#5) (with Selena Gomez) 
4 – Juice Wrld (2020)
"Godzilla" (#3) (Eminem featuring Juice Wrld)
"Come & Go" (#4) (with Marshmello)
"Life's a Mess" (#8) (with Halsey)
"Smile" (#8) (with The Weeknd)
4 – Dua Lipa (2020)
"Don't Start Now" (#2)
"Levitating" (#4)
"Break My Heart" (#7)
"Physical" (#9)
4 – Olivia Rodrigo (2021)
"Drivers License" (#1)
"Good 4 U" (#1)
"Deja Vu" (#3)
"Traitor" (#5)
4 – Justin Bieber (2021)
"Stay" (with The Kid Laroi) (#1) 
"Peaches" (with Daniel Caesar and Giveon) (#1) 
"Anyone" (#5)
"Hold On" (#6)
4 – The Kid Laroi (2021)
"Stay" (with Justin Bieber) (#1) 
"Without You" (with Miley Cyrus) (#1) 
"So Done" (#8)
"Not Sober" (with Polo G and Stunna Gambino) (#8)

Songs that have hit number one by different artists
"Mona Lisa" by Dennis Day/Nat King Cole (1950) and Conway Twitty (1959)
"Que Sera, Sera (Whatever Will Be, Will Be)" by Doris Day (1956) and Normie Rowe (1965)
"In the Summertime" by Mungo Jerry (1970) and The Mixtures (1970)
"Walk Right In" by The Rooftop Singers (1963) and Dr. Hook (1977)
"Venus" by Shocking Blue (1970) and Bananarama (1986)
"Funkytown" by Lipps Inc (1980) and Pseudo Echo (1986)
"Unchained Melody" by Al Hibbler/Les Baxter (1955) and The Righteous Brothers (1990)
"Can't Help Falling in Love" by Elvis Presley (1962) and UB40 (1993)
"The Power of Love" by Jennifer Rush (1985) and Celine Dion (1994)
"Stayin' Alive" by Bee Gees (1978) and N-Trance (1995)
"Killing Me Softly with His Song" by Roberta Flack (1973) and The Fugees (1996, entitled Killing Me Softly)
"American Pie" by Don McLean (1972) and Madonna (2000)
"What About Me" by Moving Pictures (1981) and Shannon Noll (2004)

Number-one single debuts

Pre-2000
 Midnight Oil – Species Deceases (EP) (27 November 1985)
 Kylie Minogue – "Got to Be Certain" (10 July 1988)
 U2 – "The Fly" (3 November 1991)
 Meat Loaf – "I'd Do Anything for Love (But I Won't Do That)" (5 September 1993)
 U2 – "Hold Me, Thrill Me, Kiss Me, Kill Me" (9 July 1995)
 George Michael – "Jesus to a Child" (21 January 1996)
 Metallica – "Until It Sleeps" (2 June 1996)
 Fugees – "Killing Me Softly" (23 June 1996)
 Silverchair – "Freak" (26 January 1997)
 Hanson – "MMMBop" (1 June 1997)

2000
 Madonna – "American Pie" (5 March 2000)
 *NSYNC – "Bye Bye Bye" (12 March 2000)
 Bardot – "Poison" (16 April 2000)
 Madison Avenue – "Who the Hell Are You" (11 June 2000)
 Kylie Minogue – "Spinning Around" (25 June 2000)
 Madonna – "Music" (27 August 2000)
 Kylie Minogue – "On a Night Like This" (17 September 2000)
 U2 – "Beautiful Day" (15 October 2000)

2001
 Scandal'us – "Me, Myself & I" (22 April 2001)
 Shaggy and Ricardo "RikRok" Ducent – "Angel" (3 June 2001)
 Kylie Minogue – "Can't Get You Out of My Head" (16 September 2001)

2002
 Kylie Minogue – "In Your Eyes" (27 January 2002)
 Shakira – "Whenever, Wherever" (3 February 2002)
 Scott Cain – "I'm Moving On" (12 May 2002)
 Eminem – "Without Me" (26 May 2002)
 Holly Valance – "Kiss Kiss" (9 June 2002)
 Shakira – "Underneath Your Clothes" (18 June 2002)
 Elvis Presley vs. JXL – "A Little Less Conversation" (23 June 2002)
 Avril Lavigne – "Complicated" (25 August 2002)
 Las Ketchup – "The Ketchup Song (Aserejé)" (13 October 2002)
 Nelly & Kelly Rowland – "Dilemma" (20 October 2002)
 Eminem – "Lose Yourself" (8 December 2002)

2003
 Delta Goodrem – "Lost Without You" (9 March 2003)
 t.A.T.u. – "All the Things She Said" (16 March 2003)
 Justin Timberlake – "Rock Your Body" (11 May 2003)
 R. Kelly – "Ignition (Remix)" (13 July 2003)
 Dido – "White Flag" (21 September 2003)
 Australian Idol: The Final 12 – "Rise Up" (19 October 2003)
 Kylie Minogue – "Slow" (9 November 2003)
 Britney Spears and Madonna – "Me Against the Music" (16 November 2003)
 Guy Sebastian – "Angels Brought Me Here" (30 November 2003)

2004
 Shannon Noll – "What About Me" (1 February 2004)
 Guy Sebastian – "All I Need Is You" (29 February 2004)
 Britney Spears – "Toxic" (14 March 2004)
 Usher, Ludacris and Lil Jon – "Yeah!" (28 March 2004)
 Frankee – "F.U.R.B. (Fuck You Right Back)" (13 June 2004)
 Britney Spears – "Everytime" (27 June 2004)
 Shannon Noll – "Learn to Fly" (11 July 2004)
 Paulini – "Angel Eyes" (July 2004)
 Missy Higgins – "Scar" (8 August 2004)
 Cosima De Vito – "When the War Is Over"/"One Night Without You" (15 August 2004)
 Nelly and Jaheim – "My Place/Flap Your Wings" (29 August 2004)
 Guy Sebastian – "Out with My Baby" (3 October 2004)
 Delta Goodrem – "Out of the Blue" (17 October 2004)
 Eminem – "Just Lose It" (7 November 2004)
 Gwen Stefani – "What You Waiting For?" (14 November 2004)
 Casey Donovan – "Listen with Your Heart" (5 December 2004)
 Anthony Callea – "The Prayer" (19 December 2004)

2005
 Nitty – "Nasty Girl" (23 January 2005)
 Delta Goodrem and Brian McFadden – "Almost Here" (13 March 2005)
 Anthony Callea – "Rain/Bridge over Troubled Water" (20 March 2005)
 Snoop Dogg feat. Justin Timberlake & Charlie Wilson – "Signs" (1 May 2005)
 The Black Eyed Peas – "Don't Phunk With My Heart" (22 May 2005)
 Gwen Stefani – "Hollaback Girl" (29 May 2005)
 Backstreet Boys – "Incomplete" (19 June 2005)
 Mariah Carey – "We Belong Together" (26 June 2005)
 Akon – "Lonely" (10 July 2005)
 Crazy Frog – "Axel F" (24 July 2005)
 2Pac & Elton John – "Ghetto Gospel" (21 August 2005)
 Pussycat Dolls – "Don't Cha" (28 August 2005)
 Shannon Noll – "Shine" (2 October 2005)
 Madonna – "Hung Up" (13 November 2005)
 The Black Eyed Peas – "My Humps" (20 November 2005)
 Kate DeAraugo – "Maybe Tonight" (4 December 2005)
 Lee Harding – "Wasabi!/Eye of the Tiger" (31 December 2005)

2006
 Chris Brown – "Run It!" (22 January 2006)
 Rihanna – "SOS" (23 April 2006)
 Shakira featuring Wyclef Jean – "Hips Don't Lie" (18 June 2006)
 Justin Timberlake – "SexyBack" (20 August 2006)
 U2 and Green Day – "The Saints Are Coming" (12 November 2006)
 Damien Leith – "Night of My Life" (3 December 2006)

2007
 Hinder – "Lips of an Angel" (29 January 2007)
 Silverchair – "Straight Lines" (19 March 2007)
 Missy Higgins – "Steer" (23 April 2007)
 Rihanna featuring Jay-Z – "Umbrella" (2 June 2007)
 Fergie – "Big Girls Don't Cry" (15 July 2007)
 Sean Kingston – "Beautiful Girls" (17 September 2007)
 Delta Goodrem – "In This Life" (24 September 2007)
 Kylie Minogue – "2 Hearts" (19 November 2007)

2009
 Flo Rida featuring Kesha – "Right Round" (23 February 2009)
 Vanessa Amorosi – "This Is Who I Am" (18 October 2009)

2010
 Jason Derülo – "In My Head" (21 February 2010)
 Brian McFadden – "Just Say So" (19 April 2010)
 Rihanna – "Only Girl (In the World)" (27 September 2010)
 P!nk – "Raise Your Glass" (17 October 2010)
 Kesha – "We R Who We R" (7 November 2010)

2011
 Lady Gaga – "Born This Way" (20 February 2011)
 Reece Mastin – "Good Night" (28 November 2011)

2012
 Karise Eden – "Stay With Me Baby" (25 June 2012)
 Reece Mastin – "Shout It Out" (9 July 2012)
 Pink – "Blow Me (One Last Kiss)" (16 July 2012)
 Guy Sebastian featuring Lupe Fiasco – "Battle Scars" (20 August 2012)
 Samantha Jade – "What You've Done to Me" (26 November 2012)

2013
 Baauer – "Harlem Shake" (25 February 2013)
 Jason Derülo featuring 2 Chainz – "Talk Dirty" (19 August 2013)
 Redfoo – "Let's Get Ridiculous" (16 September 2013)
 Dami Im – "Alive" (4 November 2013)
 Taylor Henderson – "Borrow My Heart" (11 November 2013)

2014
 Ed Sheeran – "Sing" (5 May 2014)
 Justice Crew – "Que Sera" (12 May 2014)
 The Veronicas – "You Ruin Me" (29 September 2014)

2015
 One Direction – "Drag Me Down" – (10 August 2015)
 Justin Bieber – "What Do You Mean?" (7 September 2015)
 Adele – "Hello" (2 November 2015)

2016
 Zayn – "Pillowtalk" (8 February 2016)
 Katy Perry – "Rise" (25 July 2016)
 Major Lazer featuring Justin Bieber & MØ – "Cold Water" (1 August 2016)

2017
 Ed Sheeran – "Shape of You" (16 January 2017)
 Harry Styles – "Sign of the Times" (17 April 2017)
 DJ Khaled featuring Justin Bieber, Quavo, Chance the Rapper and Lil Wayne – "I'm the One" (8 May 2017)
 Pink – "What About Us" (21 August 2017) 
 Taylor Swift – "Look What You Made Me Do" (4 September 2017)
 Sam Smith – "Too Good at Goodbyes" (18 September 2017)

2018
 Ariana Grande – "No Tears Left to Cry" (30 April 2018)

2019
 Ariana Grande – "7 Rings" (28 January 2019)
 Billie Eilish – "Bad Guy" (8 April 2019)
 Ed Sheeran & Justin Bieber – "I Don't Care" (20 May 2019)

2020
 Taylor Swift – "Cardigan" (3 August 2020)
 Ariana Grande – "Positions" (2 November 2020)
 Taylor Swift – "Willow" (21 December 2020)

2021
 Olivia Rodrigo – "Drivers License" (18 January 2021)
 Ed Sheeran – "Bad Habits" (5 July 2021)
 The Kid Laroi and Justin Bieber – "Stay" (19 July 2021)
 Adele – "Easy on Me" (25 October 2021)
 Taylor Swift – "All Too Well (Taylor's Version)" (19 November 2021)

2022
 Harry Styles – "As It Was" (11 April 2022)
 Jack Harlow – "First Class" (18 April 2022)
 Blackpink – "Pink Venom" (29 August 2022)
 Elton John and Britney Spears – "Hold Me Closer" (5 September 2022)
 Taylor Swift – "Anti-Hero" (31 October 2022)

2023
 Miley Cyrus – "Flowers" (23 January 2023)

Artists with the most cumulative weeks at number-one for singles
 The Beatles (130 weeks)
 Elvis Presley (61 weeks)
 Justin Bieber (48 weeks)
 ABBA (42 weeks)
 Madonna (40 weeks)
 Rihanna (39 weeks)
 Ed Sheeran (32 weeks)
 Kylie Minogue (31 weeks)
 The Black Eyed Peas (28 weeks)
 Olivia Newton-John (28 weeks)
 Skyhooks (27 weeks)
 Eminem (27 weeks)
 Michael Jackson (24 weeks)
 Flo Rida (24 weeks)
 Tones and I (24 weeks)
 John Farnham (23 weeks)
 Drake (22 weeks)
 Taylor Swift (22 weeks)
 Pharrell Williams (21 weeks)
 Bryan Adams (21 weeks)  
 Pink (19 weeks)
 Katy Perry (19 weeks)
 LMFAO (19 weeks)
 Kesha (18 weeks) 
 The Kid Laroi (18 weeks)
 Adele (17 weeks)
 Shaggy (16 weeks)
 Shakira (16 weeks)
 Britney Spears (16 weeks)

Songs with most weeks in the top 100

200 weeks or more 

 Ed Sheeran – "Perfect" (303 weeks)
 Post Malone featuring Swae Lee – "Sunflower" (219 weeks)
 Ed Sheeran – "Shape of You" (218 weeks)
 Lady Gaga and Bradley Cooper – "Shallow" (209 weeks)
 Lewis Capaldi – "Someone You Loved" (203 weeks)

100 weeks or more

 Dean Lewis – "Be Alright" (194 weeks)
 5 Seconds Of Summer – "Youngblood" (188 weeks)
 James Arthur – "Say You Won't Let Go" (186 weeks)
Tones and I – "Dance Monkey" (181 weeks)
Ed Sheeran – "Thinking Out Loud" (171 weeks)
The Weeknd – "Blinding Lights" (167 weeks)
Harry Styles – "Watermelon Sugar" (165 weeks)
Post Malone – "Circles" (146 weeks)
Dua Lipa – "Don't Start Now" (143 weeks)
The Killers – "Mr Brightside" (137 weeks)
Fleetwood Mac – "Dreams" (136 weeks)
Glass Animals – "Heat Waves" (131 weeks)
Vance Joy – "Riptide" (129 weeks)
Dua Lipa – "Levitating" (123 weeks)
Billie Eilish – "Bad Guy" (123 weeks)
 Mark Ronson featuring Bruno Mars – "Uptown Funk" (114 weeks)
 Billie Eilish and Khalid – "Lovely" (112 weeks)
 Imagine Dragons – "Believer" (111 weeks)
 The Weeknd – "Save Your Tears" (110 weeks)
Benny Blanco featuring Halsey and Khalid – "Eastside" (110 weeks)
 Lady Gaga – "Poker Face" (106 weeks)
Black Eyed Peas – "I Gotta Feeling" (106 weeks)
Kendrick Lamar – "HUMBLE." (104 weeks)
Noah Cyrus – "July" (102 weeks)
Lewis Capaldi – "Before You Go" (101 weeks)
Juice WRLD – "Lucid Dreams" (101 weeks)

75 weeks or more

Post Malone featuring 21 Savage – "Rockstar" (99 weeks)
Post Malone – "I Fall Apart" (98 weeks)
Beyoncé – "Single Ladies (Put a Ring on It)" (98 weeks)
Ed Sheeran and Justin Bieber – "I Don't Care" (97 weeks)
Lil Nas X – "Old Town Road" (96 weeks)
Travis Scott – "Sicko Mode" (95 weeks)
J. Cole – "No Role Modelz" (94 weeks)
Joel Corry & MNEK – "Head & Heart" (94 weeks)
Pharrell Williams – "Happy" (93 weeks)
Adele – "Rolling in the Deep" (93 weeks)
Queen – "Bohemian Rhapsody" (93 weeks)
Saint Jhn – "Roses" (92 weeks)
David Guetta featuring Sia – "Titanium" (92 weeks)
Regard – "Ride It" (92 weeks)
 John Legend – "All of Me" (92 weeks)
Katy Perry – "Firework" (91 weeks)
Gotye featuring Kimbra – "Somebody That I Used to Know" (90 weeks)
Maroon 5 – "Memories" (90 weeks)
24kGoldn & Iann Dior – "Mood" (89 weeks)
LMFAO featuring Lauren Bennett and GoonRock – "Party Rock Anthem" (89 weeks)
 Lady Gaga featuring Colby O'Donis – "Just Dance" (89 weeks)
 The Weeknd featuring Daft Punk – "Starboy" (88 weeks)
 The Kid Laroi with Miley Cyrus – "Without You" (87 weeks)
Ed Sheeran – "Photograph" (87 weeks)
Flume featuring Kai – "Never Be like You" (87 weeks)
Ed Sheeran – "Bad Habits" (86 weeks)
George Ezra – "Shotgun" (86 weeks)
The Chainsmokers featuring Halsey – "Closer" (86 weeks)
Goo Goo Dolls – "Iris" (85 weeks)
Calum Scott – "Dancing on My Own" (85 weeks)
The Kid Laroi and Justin Bieber – "Stay" (84 weeks)
Olivia Rodrigo – "Drivers License" (84 weeks)
Adele – "Someone like You" (84 weeks)
Imagine Dragons – "Thunder" (84 weeks)
Justin Timberlake – "Can't Stop the Feeling!" (83 weeks)
Kings of Leon – "Sex on Fire" (82 weeks)
Ed Sheeran – "Castle on the Hill" (82 weeks)
Tate McRae – "You Broke Me First" (81 weeks)
Taio Cruz – "Dynamite" (81 weeks)
Eminem and Rihanna – "Love The Way You Lie" (81 weeks)
Major Lazer and DJ Snake featuring MØ – "Lean On" (81 weeks)
Tones and I – "Never Seen the Rain" (81 weeks)
 Katy Perry – "Hot n Cold" (81 weeks)
 Elton John and Dua Lipa – "Cold Heart (Pnau Remix)" (79 weeks)
 OneRepublic – "Counting Stars" (79 weeks)
 Olivia Rodrigo – "Good 4 U" (79 weeks)
Bruno Mars – "Just the Way You Are" (79 weeks)
Coldplay – "Viva la Vida" (78 weeks)
 Sia – "Chandelier" (78 weeks)
Loud Luxury featuring Brando – "Body" (78 weeks)
Macklemore and Ryan Lewis featuring Ray Dalton – "Can't Hold Us" (77 weeks)
 Katy Perry – "Roar" (77 weeks)
Sam Feldt featuring RANI – "Post Malone" (76 weeks)
Billie Eilish – "When the Party's Over" (76 weeks)
Ed Sheeran – "Shivers" (75 weeks)
Doja Cat featuring SZA – "Kiss Me More" (75 weeks)
Harry Styles – "Adore You" (75 weeks)
LMFAO – "Sexy And I Know It" (75 weeks)
 Christina Perri – "A Thousand Years" (75 weeks)

Songs with most weeks in the top 50 
An asterisk (*) represents that a single is still in the chart

100 weeks or more
 The Weeknd – "Blinding Lights" (135 weeks)
 Lewis Capaldi – "Someone You Loved" (128 weeks)
 Dua Lipa – "Levitating" (101 weeks)*
 Tones and I – "Dance Monkey" (100 weeks)

80 weeks or more
 Glass Animals – "Heat Waves" (93 weeks)*
 Fleetwood Mac – "Dreams" (92 weeks)
 The Weeknd – "Save Your Tears" (88 weeks)*
 Ed Sheeran – "Perfect" (87 weeks)
 Harry Styles – "Watermelon Sugar" (84 weeks)
 Ed Sheeran – "Shape of You" (80 weeks)

50 weeks or more
 Benny Blanco featuring Halsey and Khalid – "Eastside" (75 weeks)
 Post Malone featuring Swae Lee – "Sunflower" (73 weeks)
 Dua Lipa – "Don't Start Now" (71 weeks)
 Olivia Rodrigo – "Good 4 U" (67 weeks)
 The Kid Laroi and Justin Bieber – "Stay" (62 weeks)*
 Billie Eilish – "Bad Guy" (62 weeks)
 Post Malone – "Circles" (62 weeks)
 24kGoldn & Iann Dior – "Mood" (60 weeks)
 Mark Ronson featuring Bruno Mars – "Uptown Funk" (58 weeks)
 Elton John and Dua Lipa – "Cold Heart (Pnau remix)" (57 weeks)*
 5 Seconds Of Summer – "Youngblood" (57 weeks)
 Doja Cat featuring SZA – "Kiss Me More" (57 weeks)
 The Kid Laroi with Miley Cyrus – "Without You" (56 weeks)
 Lil Nas X and Jack Harlow – "Industry Baby" (56 weeks)
 Queen – "Bohemian Rhapsody" (56 weeks)
 Lady Gaga and Bradley Cooper – "Shallow" (56 weeks)
 The Killers – "Mr Brightside" (55 weeks)
 Saint Jhn – "Roses" (55 weeks)
 Ed Sheeran – Shivers (53 weeks)*
 LMFAO featuring Lauren Bennett and GoonRock – "Party Rock Anthem" (53 weeks)
 Lewis Capaldi – "Before You Go" (53 weeks)
 Joel Corry & MNEK – "Head & Heart" (53 weeks)
 Olivia Rodrigo – "Drivers License" (52 weeks)
 Pharrell Williams – "Happy" (52 weeks)
 Sam Smith – "Stay with Me" (52 weeks)
 Billie Eilish and Khalid – "Lovely" (52 weeks)
 Adele – "Rolling in the Deep" (52 weeks)
 Adele – "Someone like You" (51 weeks)
 Major Lazer and DJ Snake featuring MØ – "Lean On" (51 weeks)
 Lil Nas X – "Old Town Road" (50 weeks)
 Gotye featuring Kimbra – "Somebody That I Used to Know" (50 weeks)
 Dean Lewis – "Be Alright" (50 weeks)

45 weeks or more
 Justin Bieber – "Ghost" (49 weeks)*
 Kendrick Lamar – "HUMBLE." (49 weeks)
 Post Malone – "Better Now" (49 weeks)
 DaBaby & Roddy Ricch – "Rockstar" (49 weeks)
 Post Malone featuring 21 Savage – "Rockstar" (48 weeks)
 Tate McRae – "You Broke Me First" (48 weeks)
 The Living End – "Second Solution / Prisoner of Society" (47 weeks)
 Black Eyed Peas – "I Gotta Feeling" (47 weeks)
 Ed Sheeran – "Thinking Out Loud" (47 weeks)
 Marshmello and Bastille – "Happier" (47 weeks)
 Flume featuring Kai – "Never Be Like You" (47 weeks)
 Regard – "Ride It" (47 weeks)
 Lorde – "Royals" (46 weeks)
 Lil Nas X – "Montero (Call Me by Your Name)" (46 weeks)
 Beyoncé – "Single Ladies (Put a Ring on It)" (45 weeks)
 Vance Joy – "Riptide" (45 weeks)
 Sia – "Chandelier" (45 weeks)
 Justin Timberlake – "Can't Stop the Feeling" (45 weeks)
 Tiësto – "The Business" (45 weeks)

40 weeks or more
 Taylor Swift – "Love Story" (44 weeks)
 Lil Nas X – "Thats What I Want" (44 weeks)
 Doja Cat – "Woman" (44 weeks)
 Sheppard – "Geronimo" (44 weeks)
 Mariah Carey – "All I Want for Christmas Is You" (44 weeks)
 Silverchair – "Straight Lines" (43 weeks)
 Jason Mraz – "I'm Yours" (43 weeks)
 Ed Sheeran and Justin Bieber – "I Don't Care" (43 weeks)
 Black Eyed Peas – "Boom Boom Pow" (43 weeks)
 Imagine Dragons – "Thunder" (43 weeks)
 Tones and I – "Never Seen the Rain" (42 weeks)
 Eskimo Joe – "Black Fingernails, Red Wine" (42 weeks)
 Lady Gaga – "Poker Face" (42 weeks)
 Harry Styles – "Adore You" (42 weeks)
 Vance Joy – "Missing Piece" (42 weeks)
 Lost Frequencies and Calum Scott – "Where Are You Now" (41 weeks)*
 Billie Eilish – "Happier Than Ever" (41 weeks)*
 Adele – "Easy on Me" (41 weeks)
 Coldplay – "Viva la Vida" (41 weeks)
 Post Malone – "I Fall Apart" (41 weeks)
 Maroon 5 – "Memories" (41 weeks)
 Imagine Dragons, JID and League of Legends – "Enemy" (40 weeks)
 Travis Scott – "Sicko Mode" (40 weeks)
 Westlife – "You Raise Me Up" (40 weeks)
 Bob Sinclar and Cutee B featuring Dollarman, Big Ali and Makedah – "Rock This Party (Everybody Dance Now)" (40 weeks)
 Katy Perry – "Firework" (40 weeks)
 Drake featuring Wizkid and Kyla – "One Dance" (40 weeks)
 Khalid – "Better" (40 weeks)
 George Ezra – "Shotgun" (40 weeks)

Songs with most weeks at number two

Twelve weeks
 The Weeknd featuring Daft Punk – "Starboy" (2016-17)
 Ed Sheeran – "Bad Habits" (2021)

Eleven weeks
 Taylor Swift – "Love Story" (2009)

Ten weeks
 Maroon 5 featuring Christina Aguilera – "Moves Like Jagger" (2011)
 Dua Lipa – "Don't Start Now" (2019-20)

Nine weeks
 Camila Cabello featuring Young Thug – "Havana" (2017-18)
 Shawn Mendes and Camila Cabello – "Señorita" (2019)
 Elton John & Dua Lipa – "Cold Heart (Pnau Remix)" (2021)

Eight weeks
 Bryan Adams – "Have You Ever Really Loved a Woman?" (1995)
 Ed Sheeran – "Castle on the Hill" (2017)
 Post Malone featuring Ty Dolla Sign – "Psycho" (2018)
 Post Malone – "Circles" (2019)

Seven weeks
 ABBA – "SOS" (1975-1976)
 Phil Collins – "A Groovy Kind of Love" (1988)
 Sonia Dada – "You Don't Treat Me No Good" (1992-93)
 Ugly Kid Joe – "Cat's in the Cradle" (1993)
 Bon Jovi – "Always" (1994)
 Shania Twain – "That Don't Impress Me Much" (1999)
 Nikki Webster – "Strawberry Kisses" (2001)
 Enrique Iglesias – "Hero" (2001-02)
 Justin Timberlake – "SexyBack" (2006)
 Calvin Harris featuring Rihanna – "This Is What You Came For" (2016)
 The Weeknd – "Blinding Lights" (2020)

Songs spending the most weeks in the top ten

Over 31 weeks
 85 weeks – Glass Animals – "Heat Waves" (2021-22)
 46 weeks – Ed Sheeran – "Bad Habits" (2021-22)
 45 weeks – The Kid Laroi and Justin Bieber – "Stay" (2021-22)
 41 weeks – Tones and I – "Dance Monkey" (2019-20)
 40 weeks – The Weeknd – "Blinding Lights" (2019-21)
 39 weeks – Elton John & Dua Lipa – "Cold Heart (Pnau Remix)" (2021-22)*
 33 weeks – Ed Sheeran – "Shivers" (2021-22)*
 31 weeks – Post Malone and Swae Lee – "Sunflower" (2018-19)
 31 weeks – Dua Lipa – "Levitating" (2020-21)

22–30 weeks
 29 weeks – Dua Lipa – "Don't Start Now" (2019-20)
 29 weeks – The Kid Laroi with Miley Cyrus - "Without You" (Remix) (2020-21)
 28 weeks – Lil Nas X & Jack Harlow – "Industry Baby" (2021)
 28 weeks – Post Malone – "Circles" (2019-20)
 28 weeks – 24kGoldn featuring Iann Dior – "Mood" (2020-21)
 27 weeks – Lil Nas X – "Old Town Road" (2019)
 26 weeks – Saint Jhn – "Roses" (2020)
 26 weeks – Joel Corry featuring MNEK – "Head & Heart" (2020-21)
 25 weeks – Ed Sheeran – "Perfect" (2017-18)
 25 weeks – Billie Eilish – "Bad Guy" (2019-20)
 24 weeks – ABBA – "Fernando" (1976)
 24 weeks – The Prodigy – "Breathe" (1996-97)
 24 weeks – Ed Sheeran – "Shape of You" (2017)
 24 weeks – Benny Blanco featuring Halsey and Khalid – "Eastside" (2018-19)
 23 weeks – The Chainsmokers featuring Halsey – "Closer" (2016-17)
 23 weeks – George Ezra – "Shotgun" (2018-19)
 22 weeks – The Beatles – "Hey Jude" (1968-69)
 22 weeks – Guns N' Roses – "November Rain" (1992-93)
 22 weeks – TV Rock – "Flaunt It" (2006)
 22 weeks – Lady Gaga and Bradley Cooper – "Shallow" (2018-19)
 22 weeks – Olivia Rodrigo – "Good 4 U" (2021)
 22 weeks – GAYLE – "abcdefu" (2021-22)

21 weeks (Before 2022) 
 Ray Parker Jr. – "Ghostbusters" (1984–85)
 Rick Astley – "Never Gonna Give You Up" (1987–88)
 Sandi Thom – "I Wish I Was a Punk Rocker (With Flowers in My Hair)" (2006–07)
 The Black Eyed Peas – "I Gotta Feeling" (2009-2010)
 Katy Perry – "Roar" (2013–14)
 Mark Ronson featuring Bruno Mars – "Uptown Funk" (2014–15)
 Dean Lewis – "Be Alright" (2018)
 DaBaby featuring Roddy Ricch – "Rockstar" (2020)

20 weeks (Before 2022) 
 LMFAO ft. Lauren Bennett & GoonRock – "Party Rock Anthem" (2011)
 Pharrell Williams – "Happy" (2013–14)
 Taylor Swift – "Shake It Off" (2014–15)
 5 Seconds of Summer – "Youngblood" (2018)
 Halsey – "Without Me" (2018–19)
 Lewis Capaldi – "Someone You Loved" (2019)
 Doja Cat featuring SZA – "Kiss Me More" (2021)

19 weeks (Before 2022) 
 Silverchair – "Tomorrow" (1994)
 The Black Eyed Peas – "Where Is the Love?" (2003)
 Flo Rida featuring T-Pain – "Low" (2008)
 Adele – "Rolling in the Deep" (2011)
 Maroon 5 feat Christina Aguilera – "Moves Like Jagger" (2011)
 Justin Bieber – "What Do You Mean?" (2015–16)
 Post Malone featuring 21 Savage – "Rockstar" (2017–18)
 Post Malone – "I Fall Apart" (2017–18)
 Topic and A7S – "Breaking Me" (2020)
 Jawsh 685 and Jason Derulo – "Savage Love (Laxed – Siren Beat)" (2020)

18 weeks (Before 2022)
 ABBA – "Mamma Mia" (1975–76)
 Whitney Houston – "I Will Always Love You" (1992–93)
 Wet Wet Wet – "Love Is All Around" (1994)
 Goo Goo Dolls – "Iris" (1998)
 Shania Twain – "From This Moment On" (1998–99)
 Wheatus – "Teenage Dirtbag" (2000)
 Scissor Sisters – "I Don't Feel Like Dancin'" (2006–07)
 Timbaland featuring Keri Hilson and D.O.E. – "The Way I Are" (2007–08)
 The Weeknd featuring Daft Punk – "Starboy" (2016–17)
 Luis Fonsi and Daddy Yankee featuring Justin Bieber – "Despacito" (2017)
 Post Malone – "Wow" (2019)
 The Weeknd – "Save Your Tears" (2021)
 Elton John & Dua Lipa – "Cold Heart (Pnau Remix)" (2021)

17 weeks (Before 2022)
 Queen – "Bohemian Rhapsody" (1976)
 The Bangles – "Walk Like an Egyptian" (1986–87)
 Coolio – "Gangsta's Paradise" (1995–96)
 Celine Dion – "Because You Loved Me" (1996)
 Savage Garden – "Truly Madly Deeply" (1997)
 Green Day – "Good Riddance (Time of Your Life)" (1998)
 Lighthouse Family – "High" (1998)
 Pearl Jam – "Last Kiss" (1999)
 Britney Spears – "...Baby One More Time" (1999)
 Las Ketchup – "Asereje (The Ketchup Song)" (2002)
 Evanescence – "Bring Me to Life" (2003)
 Avril Lavigne – "Girlfriend" (2007)
 Christina Aguilera – "Candyman" (2007)
 Timbaland featuring OneRepublic – "Apologize" (2007–08)
 Leona Lewis – "Bleeding Love" (2007–08)
 Kings of Leon – "Sex on Fire" (2008–09)
 Taylor Swift – "Love Story" (2009)
 Ed Sheeran – "Thinking Out Loud" (2014–15)
 Drake featuring Wizkid and Kyla – "One Dance" (2016)
 Camila Cabello featuring Young Thug – "Havana" (2017–18)
 Maroon 5 featuring Cardi B – "Girls Like You" (2018)
 Post Malone – "Wow." (2019)
 Shawn Mendes and Camila Cabello – "Señorita" (2019)
 Harry Styles – "Watermelon Sugar" (2020)
 Masked Wolf – "Astronaut in the Ocean" (2021)

16 weeks (Before 2022)
 Whitney Houston – "I Will Always Love You" (1992-2012)
 James Blunt – "Goodbye My Lover" (2005–06)
 Pink – "So What" (2008)
 Lady Gaga – "Poker Face" (2008–09)
 The Black Eyed Peas – "Boom Boom Pow" (2009)
 David Guetta featuring Akon – "Sexy Chick" (2009)
 Kesha – "Tik Tok" (2009–10)
 Katy Perry featuring Snoop Dogg – "California Gurls" (2010)
 Gotye featuring Kimbra – "Somebody That I Used to Know" (2011)
 Spice Girls – "Wannabe" (1996–97)
 Carly Rae Jepsen – "Call Me Maybe" (2012)
 Psy – "Gangnam Style" (2012–13)
 Hozier – "Take Me to Church" (2014–15)
 Calvin Harris featuring Rihanna – "This Is What You Came For" (2016)
 Bebe Rexha featuring Florida Georgia Line – "Meant to Be" (2017–18)
 Drake – "God's Plan" (2018)
 Ava Max – "Sweet But Psycho" (2018–19)
 Maroon 5 – "Memories" (2019)
 Olivia Rodrigo – "Drivers License" (2021)

15 weeks (Before 2022)
 Michael Jackson – "Black or White" (1991–92)
 Youth Group – "Forever Young" (2006)
 Justin Timberlake – "SexyBack" (2006)
 Evermore – "Light Surrounding You" (2006–07)
 Akon featuring Eminem – "Smack That" (2006–07)
 Mika – "Grace Kelly" (2007)
 Santana featuring Chad Kroeger – "Into the Night" (2007–08)
 Owl City – "Fireflies" (2009–10)
 Eminem featuring Rihanna – "Love the Way You Lie" (2010)
 Pitbull featuring Ne-Yo, Afrojack, and Nayer – "Give Me Everything" (2011)
 Adele – "Someone Like You" (2011)
 LMFAO – "Sexy and I Know It" (2011–12)
 Nicki Minaj – "Starships" (2012)
 Passenger – "Let Her Go" (2013)
 Avicii featuring Aloe Blacc – "Wake Me Up" (2013)
 Pitbull featuring Kesha – "Timber" (2013)
 John Legend – "All of Me" (2013)
 Sia – "Chandelier" (2014)
 Timmy Trumpet and Savage – "Freaks" (2014–15)
 Macklemore & Ryan Lewis featuring Eric Nally, Melle Mel, Kool Moe Dee, and Grandmaster Caz – "Downtown" (2015)
 The Chainsmokers featuring Daya – "Don't Let Me Down" (2016)
 Calum Scott – "Dancing on My Own" (2016)
 James Arthur – "Say You Won't Let Go" (2016–17)
 Ed Sheeran – "Galway Girl" (2017)
 Marshmello and Bastille – "Happier" (2018)
 Jonas Brothers – "Sucker" (2019)
 Ed Sheeran featuring Khalid – "Beautiful People" (2019)
 Doja Cat – "Say So" (2020)

Biggest drops

Songs that made the biggest drop in the top fifty (25+ places)
 Lady Gaga and Blackpink – "Sour Candy" (15 June 2020) 8→48 (40 places)
 Paul "The Chief" Harragon – "That's Gold" (10 September 2007) 8→47 (39 places)
 Kanye West featuring Paul McCartney – "Only One" (26 January 2015) 8→44 (36 places)
 Karise Eden – "Hallelujah" (2 July 2012) 2→38 (36 places)
 Jai Waetford – "Your Eyes" (24 November 2013) 6→41 (35 places)
 Sarah De Bono – "Beautiful" (2 July 2012) 4→37 (33 places)
 Kylie Minogue – "Timebomb" (18 June 2012) 12→44 (32 places)
 Taylor Swift – "Seven" (10 August 2020) 16→48 (32 places)
 Joel Turner and the Modern Day Poets – "Funk U Up" (23 May 2005) 13→44 (31 places)
 Taylor Henderson – "Girls Just Want to Have Fun" (17 November 2013) 15→46 (31 places)
 The Weeknd – "After Hours" (2020) 17→48 (31 places)
 Kylie Mole – "So Excellent-I Go I Go" (15 January 1989) 19→49 (30 places)
 Timomatic – "Can You Feel It" (20 August 2012) 18→48 (30 places)
 Taylor Swift – "Invisible String" (10 August 2020) 19→49 (30 places)
 Taylor Swift – "Run" (29 November 2021) 19→49 (30 places)
 Delta Goodrem – "I Can't Break It To My Heart" (1 September 2008) 13→42 (29 places)
 Tomislav Ivčić – "Stop the War in Croatia" (13 January 1992) 20→49 (29 places)
 5 Seconds of Summer – "Amnesia" (14 July 2014) 7→36 (29 places)
 Taylor Swift – "Mirrorball" (10 August 2020) 14→43 (29 places)
 The GetUp Mob – "From Little Things Big Things Grow" (12 May 2008) 18→46 (28 places)
 Dean Ray – "Budapest" (29 September 2014) 15→43 (28 places)
 Blackpink – "How You Like That" (13 July 2020) 12→40 (28 places)
 Kanye West – "Moon" (13 September 2021) 15→43 (28 places)
 Adele – "My Little Love" (6 December 2021) 11→39 (28 places)
 Aqua – "Doctor Jones" (16 March 1998) 10→37 (27 places)
 Short Stack – "Princess" (16 March 2009) 11→38 (27 places)
 Dean Ray – "Coming Back" (17 November 2014) 5→32 (27 places)
 Juice Wrld – "Conversations" (27 July 2020) 19→46 (27 places)
 No Doubt – "Just a Girl" (7 October 1996) 14→40 (26 places)
 Bobby McFerrin – "Don't Worry, Be Happy" (13 February 1989) 20→46 (26 places)
 Smash Mouth – "Walkin' on the Sun" (9 March 1998) 20→46 (26 places)
 Steps – "Heartbeat-Tragedy" (19 April 1999) 19→45 (26 places)
 Ricki-Lee – "Can't Sing a Different Song" (31 March 2008) 8→34 (26 places)
 André Rieu – "Yours Forever" (16 March 2009) 14→40 (26 places)
 Short Stack – "Sweet December" (10 January 2010) 21→47 (26 places)
 Jes Hudak – "Different Worlds" (4 June 2012) 21→47 (26 places)
 The Weeknd – "After Hours" (9 March 2020) 11→37 (26 places)
 Taylor Swift – "August" (10 August 2020) 13→39 (26 places)
 Calvin Harris and The Weeknd – "Over Now" (14 September 2020) 17→43 (26 places)
 Ariana Grande – "Motive" (16 November 2020) 19→45 (26 places)
 Adele – "I Drink Wine" (6 December 2021) 10→36 (26 places)
 Short Stack – "Sway, Sway Baby!" (3 August 2009) 2→27 (25 places)
 Kate Alexa – "Somebody Out There" (9 October 2006) 21→46 (25 places)
 Lee Kernaghan, Adam Brand and Steve Forde – "Spirit of the Bush" (16 July 2007) 11→36 (25 places)
 Sarah De Bono – "Listen" (11 June 2012) 13→38 (25 places)
 Eminem feat Ed Sheeran – "Those Kinda Nights" (27 January 2020) 25→50+ (25+ places)
 Megan Thee Stallion – "Savage" (3 August 2020) 25→50 (25 places)
 Adele – "Can I Get It" (6 December 2021) 15→40 (25 places)

Songs that made the biggest drop in the top hundred (40+ places)
 Mariah Carey – "All I Want for Christmas Is You" (2018) 1→100+ (100+ places)
 Francesca – "Way of the World" (2002) 3→100+ (97+ places)
 Karise Eden – "I Was Your Girl" (2012) 3→100+ (97+ places)
 Darren Percival – "Damage Down" (2012) 8→100+ (92+ places)
 Karise Eden – "Nothing Real But Love" (2012) 11→100+ (89+ places)
 Boyz II Men – "Pass You By" (2000) 13→100+ (87+ places)
 Mariah Carey – "All I Want for Christmas Is You" (1995) 15→100+ (85+ places)
 Karise Eden – "Landslide" (2012) 15→100+ (85+ places)
 Darren Percival – "For Once in My Life" (2012) 17→100+ (83+ places)
 Delta Goodrem – "Think About You" (2018) 19→100+ (81+ places)
 Karise Eden – "It's a Man's World" (2012) 21→100+ (79+ places)
 Justin Bieber – "Turn to Me" (2012) 25→100+ (75+ places)
 Cyrus Villaneuva – "Wicked Game" (2015) 6→81 (75 places)
 Nirvana – "About a Girl" (1994) 4→76 (72 places)
 Rachael Leahcar – "Shooting Star" (2012) 31→100+ (69 places)
 Rachael Leahcar – "Smile" (2012) 34→100+ (66 places)
 James Kannis – "Love 2 Love" (2006) 35→100+ (65+ places)
 Psycho Teddy – "Psycho Teddy (Do You Really Really Want To?)" – (2008) 5→70 (65 places)
 Karise Eden – "Back to Black" (2012) 36→100+ (64+ places)
 Ricki-Lee – "Don't Miss You" (2009) 24→87 (63 places)
 Karise Eden – "Hallelujah" (2012) 38→100+ (62+ places)
 Starley – "Call on Me" (2017) 38→100+ (62+ places)
 Ben Hazlewood – "I'm With You" (2012) 41→100+ (59+ places)
 Nicki Minaj – "Barbie Tingz" (2018) 41→100+ (59+ places)
 Marcia Hines and Deni Hines – "Stomp" (2006) 43→100+ (57+ places)
 Sarah De Bono – "Here's Where I Stand" (2012) 43→100+ (57+ places)
 Rachael Leahcar – "Nights in White Satin" (2012) 32→89 (57 places)
 Karise Eden – "Stay With Me Baby" (2012) 1→54 (54 places)
 Jes Hudak – "Different Worlds" (2012) 47→100+ (53+ places)
 Adam Martin – "Romeo and Juliet" (2012) 50→100 (50+ places)
 Sarah De Bono – "If I Didn't Love You" (2012) 50→100+ (50+ places)
 Sarah De Bono – "No Shame" (2012) 50→100+ (50+ places)
 Brittany Cairns – "Different Worlds" (2012) 15→64 (49 places)
 BTS featuring Desiigner – "Mic Drop" (2017) 50→99 (49 places)
 Darren Percival – "A Song for You" (2012) 52→100+ (48+ places)
 Ricki Lee Coulter – "Crazy" (2012) 52→100+ (48+ places) ("Crazy" returned to the top 100 to peak at 46 the following week.)
 The Cat Empire – "No Longer There" (2007) 12→58 (46 places)
 Karise Eden – "Stay With Me Baby" (2012) 54→100+ (46+ places)
 Backstreet Boys – "Straight Through My Heart" (2009) 54→99 (45 places)
 Fatai V – "Ave Maria" (2012) 55→100+ (45 places)
 Diana Rouvas – "I Can't Make You Love Me" (2012) 32→77 (45 places)
 DJ Teddy Z – "You Should Be Dancing" (2008) 23→67 (44 places)
 Madonna – "Celebration" (2009) 40→84 (44 places)
 Darren Percival – "Wherever I Lay My Hat" (2012) 56→100+ (44+ places)
 Viktoria Bolonina – "Bang Bang (My Baby Shot Me Down)" (2012) 56→100+ (44+ places)
 Sarah De Bono – "Listen" (2012) 38→80 (42 places)
 Darren Percival – "I Believe" (2012) 37→78 (41 places)
 Emma-Louise Birdsall – "The Look of Love" 58→99 (41 places)
 Britney Spears – "Everytime" (2004) 29→69 (40 places)
 Ben Hazlewood – "Lego House" (2012) 35→75 (40 places)

Songs that made the biggest jump in the top fifty (30+ places)
 Britney Spears – "3" (2009) 50→7 (43 places)
 George Michael – "Too Funky" (1992) 50→8 (42 places)
 Paul Lekakis – "Boom Boom (Let's Go Back To My Room)" (1987) 49→7 (42 places)
 A Great Big World and Christina Aguilera – "Say Something" (2014) 50→9 (41 places)
 Avicii featuring Aloe Blacc – "Wake Me Up!" (2013) 42→2 (40 places)
 No Mercy – "Where Do You Go" (1996) 50→10 (40 places)
 Avicii – "The Days" (2014) 50→10 (40 places)
 Ed Sheeran – "Afterglow" (2021) 47→7 (40 places)
 Vanessa Amorosi – "Absolutely Everybody" (1999) – 45→7 (38 places)
 Belinda Carlisle – "Heaven Is A Place On Earth" (1988) – 47→9 (38 places)
 Wham! – "Wake Me Up Before You Go Go" (1984) 50→13 (37 places)
 Madonna – "This Used to Be My Playground" (1992) 50→13 (37 places)
 Sinéad O'Connor – "Nothing Compares 2 U" (1990) 37→1 (36 places)
 Rudimental featuring Ed Sheeran – "Lay It All on Me" (2015) 47→11 (36 places)
 INXS – "I Send a Message" (1984) 42→7 (35 places)
 Calvin Harris featuring Ellie Goulding – "Outside" (2014) 49→14 (35 places)
 Calum Scott – "Dancing on My Own" (2016) 45→10 (35 places)
 The Grid – "Swamp Thing" (1994) 43→9 (34 places)
 Bill Medley and Jennifer Warnes – "(I've Had) The Time of My Life" (1988) 47→13 (34 places)
 Guns N' Roses – "November Rain" (1992) 41→7 (34 places)
 Wa Wa Nee – "I Could Make You Love Me" (1986) 48→14 (34 places)
 Bruno Mars – "The Lazy Song" (2011) 44→10 (34 places)
 Internet Money and Gunna featuring Don Toliver and Nav – "Lemonade (Internet Money and Gunna song)" (2020) 47→13 (34 places)
 Crowded House – "Better Be Home Soon" (1988) 36→3 (33 places)
 Queen – "Bohemian Rhapsody" (1992) 45→12 (33 places)
 Stan Walker – "Choose You" (2010) 49→16 (33 places)
 Bruno Mars – "Just the Way You Are" (2010) 43→10 (33 places)
 fun. – "Some Nights" (2012) 46→13 (33 places)
 Meghan Trainor – "All About That Bass" (2014) 36→3 (33 places)
 Billie Eilish – "When the Party's Over" (2019) 40→7 (33 places)
 INXS – "Original Sin" (1983) 41→9 (32 places)
 Red Hot Chili Peppers – "Soul To Squeeze" (1993) 46→14 (32 places)
 Ace of Base – "The Sign" (1994) 41→9 (32 places)
 Westlife – "You Raise Me Up" (2006) 40→8 (32 places)
 Psycho Teddy – "Psycho Teddy (Do You Really Really Want To?)" (2008) 44→12 (32 places)
 The Temper Trap – "Sweet Disposition" (2009) 48→16 (32 places)
 24kGoldn – "Mood" (2020) 36→4 (32 places)
 Madonna – "True Blue" (1986) 45→14 (31 places)
 Michael Jackson – "The Way You Make Me Feel" (1988) 47→16 (31 places)
 Rihanna featuring Ne-Yo – "Hate That I Love You" (2007) 49→18 (31 places)
 The Black Eyed Peas – "Meet Me Halfway" (2009) 50→19 (31 places)
 Shawn Mendes – "Treat You Better" (2016) 45→14 (31 places)
 Jonas Blue featuring JP Cooper – "Perfect Strangers" (2016) 42→11 (31 places)
 The Weeknd – "After Hours" (2020) 48→17 (31 places)
 ABBA – "Dancing Queen" (1976) 38→8 (30 places)
 Eurythmics – "Missionary Man" (1986) 49→19 (30 places)
 Alice Cooper – "Poison" (1989) 49→19 (30 places)
 Sting – "We'll Be Together" (1987) 50→20 (30 places)
 Kylie Minogue – "Confide in Me" (1994) 31→1 (30 places)
 Glee Cast – "Halo/Walking on Sunshine" (2009) 40→10 (30 places)
 Jay Sean featuring Lil Wayne – "Hit The Lights" (2011) 48→18 (30 places)
 Ed Sheeran – "Lego House" (2012) 49→19 (30 places)
 Rudimental – "Feel the Love" (2012) 42→12 (30 places)
 Rihanna – "Don't Stop the Music" (2008) 31→1 (30 places)
 Macklemore & Ryan Lewis featuring Mary Lambert – Same Love (2013) 39→9 (30 places)
 Klingande – "Jubel" (2014) 41→11 (30 places)
 The Script – "Superheroes" (2014) 39→9 (30 places)
 James Bay – "Hold Back the River" (2015) 43→13 (30 places)

Songs that made the biggest jump in the top hundred (50+ places)
 David Bowie & Mick Jagger – "Dancing in the Street" (1985) 97→3 (94 places)
 Silverchair – "Pure Massacre" (1995) 92→2 (90 places)
 Spacey Jane – "Booster Seat" (2021) 94→8 (86 places)
 Ocean Alley – "Confidence" (2019) 93→9 (84 places)
 Gabrielle Aplin – "Please Don't Say You Love Me" (2014) 86→3 (83 places)
 Madonna – "Angel/Into The Groove" (1985) 99→17 (82 places)
 The Incredible Penguins – "Happy Xmas (War Is Over)" (1985) 90→10 (80 places)
 Alice Deejay – "Back in My Life" (2000) 96→19 (77 places)
 Paloma Faith – "Only Love Can Hurt Like This" (2014) 82→7 (75 places)
 Jessie J – "Masterpiece" (2015) 91→18 (73 places)
 Glee Cast – Poker Face (2010) 97→25 (72 places)
 Hampton The Hampster – "Thank God I'm A Country Boy" (2001) 90→20 (70 places)
 Los Lobos – La Bamba (1987) 92→24 (68 places)
 Eminem – "The Real Slim Shady" (2000) 95→27 (68 places)
 Lady Gaga – "Poker Face" (2008) 94→26 (68 places)
 Jessica Mauboy – "This Ain't Love" (2015) 75→8 (67 places) 
 Luis Fonsi and Daddy Yankee featuring Justin Bieber – "Despacito" (2017) 93→26 (67 places)
Queen – "Bohemian Rhapsody" (2018) 92→26 (66 places) 
 Nine Inch Nails – "The Day The World Went Away" (1999) 95→31 (64 places)
 Billy Joel – "It's Still Rock and Roll to Me" (1980) 99→36 (63 places)
 Beyoncé – "Halo" (2009) 92→29 (63 places)
 Metallica – "The Day That Never Comes" (2008) 81→18 (63 places)
 Survivor – "Eye of the Tiger" (1982) 93→31 (62 places)
 Royal Philharmonic Orchestra – "Hooked On Classics" (1981) 87→25 (62 places)
 Taylor Swift – "Love Story" (2009) 100→38 (62 places)
 Little River Band – "The Other Guy" (1983) 89→28 (61 places)
 Roxette – "Dressed For Success" (1989) 89→28 (61 places)
 Candice Alley – "Before You Go" (2007) 85→24 (61 places)
 Diana Ross & Lionel Richie – "Endless Love" (1981) 87→27 (60 places)
 TLC – "Dear Lie" (2000) 97→37 (60 places)
 Destiny's Child – "Soldier" (2005) 63→3 (60 places)
 Jinn – "Part A" (2006) 92→32 (60 places)
 Wiz Khalifa featuring Charlie Puth – "See You Again" (2015) 59→1 (58 places)
 Joan Jett & The Blackhearts – "I Love Rock 'n' Roll" (1982) 84→26 (58 places)
 Electric Light Orchestra – "Hold On Tight" (1981) 90→32 (58 places)
 Enrique Iglesias featuring Ludacris – "Tonight (I'm Lovin' You)" (2011) 61→3 (58 places)
 Mariah Carey – "All I Want for Christmas Is You" (2021) 76→18 (58 places)
 The White Stripes – "7 Nation Army" (2003) 74→17 (57 places)
 Sheena Easton – "Morning Train (9 to 5)" (1981) 85→30 (55 places)
 Phil Collins – "In the Air Tonight" (1981) 93→38 (55 places)
 DJ Sammy featuring Yanou & Do – "Heaven" (2002) 77→22 (55 places)
 Demi Lovato – "Sorry Not Sorry" (2017) 90→35 (55 places)
 Queen – "Bohemian Rhapsody" (1992) – 99→45 (54 places)
 Cardi B, Bad Bunny and J Balvin – "I Like It" (2018) – 79→25 (54 places)
 The Ronettes – "Sleigh Ride" (2020) 90→36 (54 places)
 Eminem – "Beautiful" (2009) – 100→47 (53 places)
 Tonite Only – "We Run The Nite" (2011) 99→46 (53 places)
 Frank Sinatra – "Let It Snow! Let It Snow! Let It Snow!" (2020) 99→46 (53 places)
 Jessie J – "Nobody's Perfect" (2011) 76→24 (52 places)
 Lady Gaga – "LoveGame" (2009) 92→41 (51 places)
 Snoop Dogg and David Guetta – "Sweat" (2011) 60→9 (51 places)
 Ed Sheeran – "Bloodstream" (2015) 58→7 (51 places)
 Ed Sheeran – "Visiting Hours" (2021) 80→29 (51 places)
 Sam Clark – "Broken" (2010) – 100→50 (50 places)
 Imagine Dragons & JID – "Enemy" (2021) – 85→35 (50 places)

Self-replacement at number one
The Beatles
"I Want to Hold Your Hand" (seven weeks) → "I Saw Her Standing There"/"Love Me Do" (seven weeks) (15 February 1964) → "Roll Over Beethoven"/"Hold Me Tight" (two weeks) (4 April 1964) → All My Loving EP (three weeks) (18 April 1964) → "Can't Buy Me Love"/"You Can't Do That" (five weeks) (9 May 1964)
"Can't Buy Me Love"/"You Can't Do That" (one week) → Requests (EP): "Long Tall Sally"/"Boys"/"I Call Your Name" (one week) (4 July 1964)
"A Hard Day's Night"/"Things We Said Today" (six weeks) → "I Should Have Known Better"/"If I Fell" (five weeks) (5 September 1964)
"Rock and Roll Music"/"Honey Don't" (four weeks) → "Ticket to Ride"/"Yes It Is" (three weeks) (1 May 1965)
ABBA – "I Do, I Do, I Do, I Do, I Do" (three weeks) → "Mamma Mia" (ten weeks) (3 November 1975) → "SOS" (one week) (12 January 1976)
Madonna – "Angel"/"Into the Groove" (four weeks) → "Crazy for You" (four weeks) (22 July 1985)
The Black Eyed Peas – "Boom Boom Pow" (six weeks) → "I Gotta Feeling" (seven weeks) (29 June 2009)
Macklemore and Ryan Lewis – "Thrift Shop" (featuring Wanz) (seven weeks) → "Same Love" (featuring Mary Lambert) (four weeks) (21 January 2013)
Pharrell Williams – "Get Lucky" (Daft Punk featuring Pharrell Williams) (one week) → "Blurred Lines" (Robin Thicke featuring Pharrell Williams and T.I.) (eight weeks) (13 May 2013)
Justin Bieber – "I'm the One" (DJ Khaled featuring Justin Bieber, Quavo, Chance the Rapper and Lil Wayne) (two weeks) → "Despacito" (Luis Fonsi and Daddy Yankee featuring Justin Bieber) (thirteen weeks) (22 May 2017)
Drake – "God's Plan" (eleven weeks) → "Nice for What" (two non-consecutive weeks) (23 April 2018)

Non-English number ones
Domenico Modugno – "Nel blu dipinto di blu (Volare)" (Italian – seven weeks) (25 October 1958)
Kyu Sakamoto – "Sukiyaki" (Japanese – two weeks) (13 July 1963)
Nena – "99 Luftballons" (German – five weeks) (2 April 1984)
Los Lobos – "La Bamba" (Spanish – seven weeks) (28 September 1987)
Los del Río – "Macarena" (Spanish/English – nine weeks) (31 August 1996)
Ricky Martin – "María" (Spanish – six weeks) (21 June 1998) alongside "The Cup of Life" (English)
Las Ketchup – "The Ketchup Song (Aserejé)" (Spanish/English – three weeks) (13 October 2002)
Psy – "Gangnam Style" (Korean/English – six weeks) (1 October 2012)
Luis Fonsi and Daddy Yankee featuring Justin Bieber – "Despacito" (Spanish/English – thirteen weeks) (22 May 2017)
Blackpink - "Pink Venom" (Korean/English – one week) (29 August 2022)

Albums with most weeks at number one
76 weeks
 Soundtrack – The Sound of Music (1965–1967)

34 weeks
 Dire Straits – Brothers in Arms (1985–1986)

32 weeks
 Adele – 21 (2011–2012)

30 weeks
 The Beatles – Sgt. Pepper's Lonely Hearts Club Band (1967–1968)

29 weeks
 Neil Diamond – Hot August Night (1973–1974)
 Delta Goodrem – Innocent Eyes (2003–2004)

28 weeks
 Original Australian Broadway cast – Hair (1969)

27 weeks
 Ed Sheeran – ÷ (2017–2018)

25 weeks
 John Farnham – Whispering Jack (1986–1987)

20 weeks
 Shania Twain – Come On Over (1997–1999)

19 weeks
 Savage Garden – Savage Garden (1997)

18 weeks
 Mariah Carey – Music Box (1993–1994)

Albums with most weeks in Top 100 chart (since 1988; over 98 weeks or 2 years)

300 weeks or more 
 547 weeks INXS – The Very Best (2011–2023)
 517 weeks Fleetwood Mac – The Very Best of Fleetwood Mac (2002–2020)
 503 weeks Cold Chisel – The Best Of Cold Chisel: All For You (2011–2023)
 481 weeks Red Hot Chili Peppers – Greatest Hits (2003-2004, 2006–2007, 2011, 2017–2023)
 480 weeks Guns N' Roses – Greatest Hits (2004–2007, 2009–2011, 2017–2023)
 476 weeks Adele – 21 (2011-2013, 2015, 2017–2023)
 447 weeks Queen – Greatest Hits (1981, 1991–1992, 1994, 2008, 2011, 2017–2023)
 441 weeks Ed Sheeran – x (2014–2023)
 434 weeks Taylor Swift – 1989 (2014–2023)
 433 weeks Foo Fighters – Greatest Hits (2009-2012, 2017–2022)
 414 weeks Fleetwood Mac – Rumours (1975–2023)
 410 weeks Ed Sheeran – + (2011–2022)
 407 weeks Bon Jovi – Greatest Hits (2018–2023)
 385 weeks Guns N' Roses – Appetite For Destruction (1988–2023)
 372 weeks Nirvana – Nevermind (2021–2023)
 369 weeks Eminem – Curtain Call: The Hits (2005–2023)
 352 weeks Katy Perry – Teenage Dream: The Complete Confection (2019–2023)
 345 weeks Adele – 25 (2017–2023)
 329 weeks Michael Jackson – The Essential Michael Jackson (2005, 2008–2010, 2017–2018)
 327 weeks Bruno Mars – Doo-Wops & Hooligans (2010-2014, 2016–2023)
 311 weeks Ed Sheeran – ÷ (2017–2023)

200 weeks or more 
 299 weeks Metallica – Metallica (1991-1993, 1996, 1998, 2008, 2010–2011, 2021–2023)
 297 weeks Maroon 5 – Singles (2017–2023)
 295 weeks ABBA – ABBA Gold – Greatest Hits (1992-1995, 1999–2000, 2008–2009, 2011, 2013, 2017–2023)
 291 weeks Fleetwood Mac – Greatest Hits (1988–2022)
 284 weeks Post Malone – Stoney (2017–2023)
 284 weeks P!nk – Greatest Hits...So Far!!! (2010–2020)
 277 weeks Crowded House – The Very Very Best Of Crowded House (2010–2021) 
 275 weeks Taylor Swift – Reputation (2017–2023)
 272 weeks Dua Lipa – Dua Lipa (2017–2023)
 265 weeks Eminem – The Eminem Show (2002–2023)
 260 weeks Soundtrack – The Greatest Showman (2017–2023)
 257 weeks Luke Combs – This One's For You (2018–2023)
 252 weeks XXXTentacion – ? (2018–2023)
 249 weeks Meat Loaf – Bat Out Of Hell (1978, 1991, 2011, 2020, 2022)
 247 weeks Post Malone – Beerbongs and Bentleys (2018–2023)
 246 weeks Soundtrack – Guardians Of The Galaxy: Awesome Mix Vol. 1 (2014–2022)
 245 weeks Elton John – Diamonds (2017–2023)
 245 weeks Soundtrack – Frozen (2017–2020, 2022)
 242 weeks Arctic Monkeys – AM (2013–2023)
 237 weeks Green Day – Greatest Hits: God's Favorite Band (2017–2023)
 237 weeks Khalid – American Teen (2017–2022)  
 232 weeks The Eagles – The Very Best of the Eagles (2017–2019)  
 231 weeks Drake – Scorpion (2018–2023)  
 229 weeks Billie Eilish – Don't Smile at Me (2018–2023)  
 229 weeks The Wiggles – The Best Of The Wiggles (2016–2021)
 227 weeks Lady Gaga – The Fame (2018, 2020–2023)
 226 weeks Queen – Bohemian Rhapsody: The Original Soundtrack (2019–2023)
 219 weeks Vance Joy – Dream Your Life Away (2014–2019, 2021, 2023)
 216 weeks Harry Styles – Harry Styles (2017–2023)
 214 weeks Kendrick Lamar – Good Kid, M.A.A.D City (2017–2023)
 214 weeks Travis Scott – Astroworld (2018–2023)
 210 weeks P!nk – I'm Not Dead (2018)
 203 weeks Billie Eilish – When We All Fall Asleep, Where Do We Go? (2019–2023)
 201 weeks Hilltop Hoods – Drinking From The Sun, Walking Under Stars Restrung (2016–2020, 2022)

150 weeks or more 
 196 weeks Lewis Capaldi – Divinely Uninspired to a Hellish Extent (2019–2023)
 196 weeks Amy Winehouse – Back To Black (2007–2012, 2021–2023)
 191 weeks Pearl Jam – Ten (2021)
 187 weeks Soundtrack – Moana (2017–2020, 2022)
 187 weeks Michael Bublé – Michael Bublé (2003–2005, 2008, 2010–2011)
 185 weeks The Weeknd – Starboy (2017–2018, 2020–2023)
 183 weeks Coldplay – Live in Buenos Aires (2018–2023)
 182 weeks Taylor Swift – Lover (2019–2023)
 182 weeks Norah Jones – Come Away With Me (2022)
 180 weeks Taylor Swift – Fearless (2008–2012, 2018)   
 178 weeks Bob Marley and the Wailers – Legend (2020–2023)
 178 weeks Post Malone – Hollywood's Bleeding (2019–2023)
 178 weeks Elton John – Rocket Man: The Definitive Hits (2007–2019)   
 177 weeks Michael Jackson – Thriller (2017, 2021–2023)
 174 weeks Kendrick Lamar – DAMN. (2017–2023)
 174 weeks Andrea Bocelli – Romanza (2017)
 171 weeks Luke Combs – What You See Is What You Get (2019–2023)
 171 weeks Ed Sheeran – No.6 Collaborations Project (2019–2023)
 171 weeks The Beatles – 1 (2000–2003, 2011–2012, 2017–2019, 2021, 2023)
 166 weeks Harry Styles – Fine Line (2019–2023)
 165 weeks Live – Throwing Copper (2019)
 162 weeks Justin Bieber – Purpose (2015-2020)
 160 weeks Jason Derulo – Platinum Hits (2018–2023)
 159 weeks AC/DC – Live (1992–2019)
 157 weeks Dean Lewis – A Place We Knew (2019–2023)
 154 weeks Bruce Springsteen – Greatest Hits (2017–2018)
 151 weeks Dua Lipa – Future Nostalgia (2020–2023)

125 weeks or more 
 149 weeks The Weeknd – After Hours (2020–2023)
 149 weeks Queen – The Platinum Collection (2017–2022)
 146 weeks Alanis Morissette – Jagged Little Pill (1995–1998, 2017, 2020)
 142 weeks Michael Bublé – It's Time (2005–2009, 2011)
 140 weeks Dr. Dre – 2001 (2017–2018, 2020–2023)
 140 weeks Linkin Park – Hybrid Theory (2001-2002, 2011, 2017, 2020, 2023)
 140 weeks Kings of Leon – >ONLY_BY_THE_NIGHT> (2022)
 140 weeks Nirvana – MTV Unplugged in New York (2020–2022)
 140 weeks Florence & The Machine – Lungs (2008-2012)#
 140 weeks Creedence Clearwater Revival – Chronicle – The 20 Greatest Hits (1976, 2008–2012)#
 139 weeks Adele – 19 (2017, 2021)
 137 weeks Red Hot Chili Peppers – Californication (2017, 2019, 2023)
 137 weeks Pop Smoke – Shoot for the Stars, Aim for the Moon (2020–2023)
 136 weeks The Killers – Hot Fuss (2020)
 135 weeks Tame Impala – Currents (2017–2023)
 135 weeks Pink Floyd – The Dark Side Of The Moon (1973, 1993–1994, 2005, 2011–2012, 2018, 2021–2023)
 135 weeks Cardi B – Invasion of Privacy (2018–2021)
 134 weeks Taylor Swift – Folklore (2020–2023)
 133 weeks The Kid Laroi – F*ck Love (2020–2023)
 132 weeks Juice Wrld – Goodbye & Good Riddance (2019–2022)
 129 weeks Cat Stevens – The Very Best of Cat Stevens (2018–2019)
 128 weeks Doja Cat – Hot Pink (2019–2022)
 127 weeks Pitbull – Greatest Hits (2022–2023)
 127 weeks Soundtrack – Pulp Fiction (2019)
 127 weeks Pink – Funhouse (2008–2010, 2018)

110 weeks or more 
 124 weeks Tyler, the Creator – IGOR (2019–2023)
 124 weeks U2 – The Joshua Tree (2017, 2019)
 124 weeks Powderfinger – Odyssey Number Five (2020–2021)
 123 weeks Soundtrack – Grease (2022)
 122 weeks INXS – Kick (2017–2023)
 122 weeks Powderfinger – Internationalist (2018, 2020)
 122 weeks Def Leppard – Hysteria (2018, 2020)
 121 weeks Shawn Mendes – Shawn Mendes (2018–2020)
 121 weeks Kings Of Leon – Only By The Night (2008-2011)
 119 weeks Taylor Swift – Red (2020–2021)
 119 weeks Shawn Mendes – Illuminate (2017–2019)
 119 weeks Ariana Grande – Dangerous Woman (2017–2019)
 118 weeks Jimmy Barnes – Barnes Hits Anthology (2018)
 118 weeks Soundtrack – Suicide Squad: The Album (2016–2020)
 117 weeks Lana Del Rey – Born to Die (2018, 2022–2023)
 117 weeks Imagine Dragons – Evolve (2017–2020)
 115 weeks Guns N' Roses – Use Your Illusion II (2017, 2022)
 115 weeks Bruce Springsteen – Born in the U.S.A. (2017, 2021–2022)
 115 weeks Kasey Chambers – The Captain (2019)
 114 weeks Spacey Jane – Sunlight (2020–2023)
 114 weeks Spice Girls – Spice (2021)
 114 weeks One Direction – Up All Night (2020)
 114 weeks Katy Perry – Prism (2017–2018)
 113 weeks Juice WRLD – Legends Never Die (2020–2022)
 113 weeks The Weeknd – Beauty Behind the Madness (2017–2018, 2020–2022)
 113 weeks The Killers – Direct Hits (2017–2020)
 113 weeks Coldplay – Parachutes (2020–2021)
 112 weeks The Doors – The Very Best of the Doors (2017)
 112 weeks Missy Higgins –The Sound of White (2019)
 110 weeks Morgan Wallen – Dangerous: The Double Album (2021–2023)
 110 weeks Guns N' Roses – Use Your Illusion I (2017, 2022)
 110 weeks Pearl Jam – Rearviewmirror (Greatest Hits 1991–2003) (2017)

98 weeks or more 
 108 weeks Cat Stevens – Remember (2017–2018)
 107 weeks Taylor Swift – evermore (2020–2023)
 107 weeks Kanye West – My Beautiful Dark Twisted Fantasy (2022–2023)
 107 weeks Nickelback – Dark Horse (2008–2011)
 106 weeks The Weeknd – The Highlights (2021–2023)
 106 weeks Green Day – American Idiot (2017, 2021)
 106 weeks Sia – This Is Acting (2017–2018)
 106 weeks Neil Young – Greatest Hits (2004-2006, 2009–2011)
 105 weeks Elton John – Goodbye Yellow Brick Road (2017, 2019–2021, 2023)
 105 weeks Soundtrack – Molly: Do Yourself a Favour (2017–2019)
 104 weeks Ariana Grande –Thank U, Next (2019–2021)
 104 weeks Paul Kelly – Songs From The South Volumes 1 & 2 (1997-2019)
 104 weeks P!nk – The Truth About Love (2017–2018)
 104 weeks Bee Gees – Their Greatest Hits: The Record (2017)
 104 weeks Sia – 1000 Forms of Fear (2017)
 104 weeks Phil Collins – Hits (1998–1999, 2008–2011)
 103 weeks Bruno Mars – XXIVK Magic (2017–2019, 2022)
 103 weeks Gurrumul – Gurrumul (2017) 
 103 weeks Radiohead – OK Computer OKNOTOK 1997 2017 (2017) 
 103 weeks Meghan Trainor – Title (2016–2017) 
 102 weeks Dire Straits – Brothers In Arms (1985, 2010)
 101 weeks Rihanna – Good Girl Gone Bad (2023)
 101 weeks Michael Bublé – Christmas (2023)
 101 weeks The Beatles – Abbey Road (2019–2021, 2023) 
 100 weeks Lorde – Pure Heroine (2017, 2020–2022) 
 99 weeks Soundtrack – Guardians Of The Galaxy Vol. 2: Awesome Mix Vol. 2 (2017–2022) 
 98 weeks Justin Bieber – Justice (2021–2023) 
 98 weeks Audioslave – Audioslave (2017)
 98 weeks The Cranberries – Everybody Else Is Doing It, So Why Can't We? (1993-1995)
(Note: Updated 6 September 2022; some pre-2022 albums may need weeks readjusted)
[# at W/C: 7/5/12] - not complete (above)

Most weeks in ARIA Top 50 Albums Chart
An asterisk (*) represents that an album is still in the chart

300 weeks or more
 381 weeks INXS – "The Very Best" (2011)
 301 weeks Taylor Swift – "1989" (2014)*

200 weeks or more
 291 weeks Ed Sheeran – "x" (2014)
 273 weeks Ed Sheeran – "÷" (2017)*
 246 weeks Ed Sheeran – "+" (2011)
 243 weeks Fleetwood Mac – "Rumours" (1977)*
 242 weeks Eminem – "Curtain Call: The Hits" (2005)*
 214 weeks Adele – "21" (2011)
 212 weeks Queen – "Greatest Hits" (1981)
 207 weeks Luke Combs – "This One's for You" (2017)*

150 weeks or more
 195 weeks Pink – "Greatest Hits... So Far!!!" (2010)
 191 weeks Fleetwood Mac – "The Very Best of Fleetwood Mac" (2002)
 189 weeks Cold Chisel – "The Best of Cold Chisel" (2011)
 184 weeks Elton John – "Diamonds" (2017)*
 178 weeks Dua Lipa – "Dua Lipa" (2017)*
 177 weeks Various Artists – "The Greatest Showman" (2018)
 175 weeks Adele – "25" (2015)*
 174 weeks Bruno Mars – "Doo-Wops & Hooligans" (2010)*
 172 weeks XXXTentacion – "?" (2018)
 171 weeks Queen – "Bohemian Rhapsody: The Original Soundtrack" (2018)*
 167 weeks Pink – "I'm Not Dead" (2006)
 165 weeks Billie Eilish – "When We All Fall Asleep, Where Do We Go?" (2019)*
 161 weeks Maroon 5 – "Singles" (2015)*
 161 weeks Various Artists – "Guardians of the Galaxy" (2014)

100 weeks or more
 146 weeks Lewis Capaldi – "Divinely Uninspired to a Hellish Extent" (2019)*
 146 weeks Shania Twain – "Come On Over" (1997)
 146 weeks Guns N' Roses – "Greatest Hits" (2004)
 142 weeks Katy Perry – "Teenage Dream: The Complete Confection" (2012)*
 142 weeks Post Malone – "Beerbongs & Bentleys" (2017)
 140 weeks Post Malone – "Stoney" (2016)
 133 weeks Luke Combs – "What You See Is What You Get" (2019)*
 133 weeks ABBA – "ABBA Gold - Greatest Hits" (1992)
 129 weeks Foo Fighters – "Greatest Hits" (2009)*
 128 weeks Harry Styles – "Fine Line" (2019)*
 125 weeks Taylor Swift – "Lover" (2019)*
 117 weeks Live – "Throwing Copper" (1994)
 116 weeks Metallica – "Metallica" (1991)
 115 weeks Michael Bublé – "Michael Bublé" (2003)
 114 weeks Taylor Swift – "Reputation" (2017)*
 113 weeks Dua Lipa – "Future Nostalgia" (2020)*
 112 weeks Soundtrack – "Frozen" (2013)
 109 weeks Nirvana – "Nevermind" (1991)*
 108 weeks Drake – "Scorpion" (2018)
 108 weeks Norah Jones – "Come Away With Me" (2002)
 107 weeks The Eagles – "The Very Best of the Eagles" (1994)
 106 weeks Billie Eilish – "Don't Smile at Me" (2017)
 106 weeks Ed Sheeran – "No.6 Collaborations Project" (2019)
 106 weeks Guns N' Roses – "Appetite for Destruction" (1988)
 104 weeks Khalid – "American Teen" (2017)
 104 weeks Post Malone – "Hollywood's Bleeding" (2019)
 104 weeks Pink – "Funhouse" (2008)
 104 weeks Travis Scott – "Astroworld" (2018)
 103 weeks Powderfinger – "Internationalist" (1998)
 102 weeks Sam Smith – "In the Lonely Hour" (2014)

Artists with the most number-one albums
Jimmy Barnes (16) 
The Beatles (14)
Madonna (12)
U2 (11)
Taylor Swift (10)
Bon Jovi (10)
Eminem (10)
John Farnham (10)
Foo Fighters (8)
Elton John (7)
Pearl Jam (7)
Rod Stewart (7)
The 12th Man (7)
Metallica (7)
Kylie Minogue (7)
Coldplay (7)
Hilltop Hoods (6)
Michael Jackson (6)
Red Hot Chili Peppers (6)
The Rolling Stones (6)
Celine Dion (5) 
Pink (5)
Delta Goodrem (5)
ABBA (5)
5 Seconds of Summer (5)

Artists with multiple albums in Top 100
David Bowie (17) – January 2016
Michael Jackson (14) – July 2009
Bon Jovi (8) – January 2008
Taylor Swift (8) - October 2022

Artists at number one on singles and albums chart at the same time
Macy Gray – "I Try" and On How Life Is (10 January 2000 – 17 January 2000)
Eminem – "Stan" and The Marshall Mathers LP (5 March 2001)
Eminem – "Without Me" and The Eminem Show (3 June 2002, 17 June 2002)
Eminem – "Lose Yourself" and 8 Mile (27 January 2003 - 3 February 2003)
Delta Goodrem – "Innocent Eyes" and Innocent Eyes (30 June 2003 – 7 July 2003)
Delta Goodrem – "Not Me, Not I" and Innocent Eyes (29 September 2003)
Guy Sebastian – "Angels Brought Me Here" and Just As I Am (15 December 2003)
Shannon Noll – "What About Me" and That's What I'm Talking About (16 February 2004 – 23 February 2004)
D12 – "My Band" and D12 World (3 May 2004)
Damien Leith – "Night of My Life" and The Winner's Journey (18 December 2006 – 25 December 2006)
Hinder – "Lips of an Angel" and Extreme Behaviour (26 February 2007)
Fergie – "Big Girls Don't Cry" and The Dutchess (30 July 2007 – 20 August 2007)
Timbaland – "Apologize" and Shock Value (31 December 2007 – 14 January 2008)
Madonna – "4 Minutes" and Hard Candy (5 May 2008)
Kings of Leon – "Sex on Fire" and Only by the Night (20 October 2008)
The Black Eyed Peas – "Boom Boom Pow" and The E.N.D. (15 June 2009)
Eminem – "Love the Way You Lie" and Recovery (19 July 2010 – 2 August 2010, 16 August 2010 - 23 August 2010)
Adele – "Someone like You" and 21 (27 June 2011 – 8 August 2011)
Gotye – "Somebody That I Used to Know" and Making Mirrors (29 August 2011)
Eminem – "The Monster" and The Marshall Mathers LP 2 (18 November 2013)
Pharrell Williams – "Happy" and Girl (17 March 2014)
Taylor Swift – "Blank Space" and 1989 (1 December 2014)
Adele – "Hello" and 25 (30 November 2015 – 7 December 2015)
Lukas Graham – "7 Years" and Lukas Graham (11 April 2016)
Drake – "One Dance" and Views (9 May 2016)
Ed Sheeran – "Shape of You" and ÷ (13 March 2017 → 10 April 2017, 24 April 2017 – 1 May 2017)
Ed Sheeran – "Perfect" and ÷ (18 December 2017, 1 January 2018)
 Post Malone – "Psycho" and Beerbongs & Bentleys (7 May 2018)
 5 Seconds of Summer – "Youngblood" and Youngblood (25 June 2018)
 Lady Gaga and Bradley Cooper – "Shallow" and A Star Is Born (29 October 2018 – 12 November 2018)
 Ariana Grande – "7 Rings" and Thank U, Next (18 February 2019)
 Billie Eilish – "Bad Guy" and When We All Fall Asleep, Where Do We Go? (8 April 2019 – 15 April 2019)
 The Weeknd – "Blinding Lights" and After Hours (23 March 2020 – 30 March 2020)
 Taylor Swift – "Cardigan" and Folklore (27 July 2020 – 3 August 2020)
 Taylor Swift – "Willow" and Evermore (14 December 2020 – 21 December 2020)
 Justin Bieber – "Peaches" and Justice (5 April 2021 – 12 April 2021)
 Olivia Rodrigo – "Good 4 U" and Sour (31 May 2021 – 28 June 2021)
 Taylor Swift – "All Too Well (Taylor's Version)" and Red (Taylor's Version) (22 November 2021)
 Adele – "Easy on Me" and 30 (29 November 2021 – 6 December 2021)
 Taylor Swift - "Anti-Hero and Midnights (28 October 2022 - November 28, 2022)

Simultaneously occupying the top three positions

Albums
For the first time in ARIA chart history, Michael Jackson occupied the first three spots of the Albums Chart, after his death.
1. The Essential Michael Jackson2. Number Ones3. ThrillerSingles
After winning season one of The Voice, Karise Eden simultaneously occupied the top three positions of the singles chart, the first time this has occurred in Australian chart history since The Beatles held the top six spots in 1964.
1. "Stay With Me Baby"
2. "Hallelujah"
3. "I Was Your Girl"

On 27 February 2017, Ed Sheeran occupied the top three positions. However next week, "How Would You Feel" fell out of the top ten and was replaced by The Chainsmokers and Coldplay's "Something Just like This". 
1. "Shape of You" 
2. "How Would You Feel (Paean)"
3. "Castle on the Hill"

On 28 October 2022, Taylor Swift occupied the top three positions and nine overall in the top 10, including the top six positions, with songs from her album Midnights.
1. "Anti-Hero"
2. "Lavender Haze"
3. "Snow on the Beach" (feat. Lana Del Rey)

Other achievements
 The first artist to have singles debut at the top two simultaneously was Ed Sheeran on 16 January 2017 with "Shape of You" at number one and "Castle on the Hill" at number two.
 Ed Sheeran has had 3 albums, "÷", "x", and "+" simultaneously in the top 50 for 36 consecutive weeks, from the debut of "÷" on 19 March 2017 to the departure of "+" on 19 November 2017. Together, these albums spent a total of 810 weeks in the top 50.
 All 16 tracks from Taylor Swift's album Folklore'' debuted on the singles chart breaking the all-time record for the most simultaneous debuts in one week.
 On October 28, 2022 Taylor Swift simultaneously occupied 9 out of the 10 spots in the top ten of the singles chart becoming the artist to occupy the most spots in the top ten at a time. She also became the artist with most top ten singles earned in a year.
 Taylor Swift's "Anti-Hero" became the first song in the chart's history to debut at number one on the airplay chart. Swift was also atop the singles and albums chart making her the very first artist to simultaneously hold three number one's in ARIA chart history.

Notes

References

chart achievements and milestones
Australia
Australian record charts